= 1998 Arizona Diamondbacks season =

1998 Arizona Diamondbacks
- League: National League
- Division: West
- Ballpark: Bank One Ballpark
- City: Phoenix, Arizona
- Record: 65–97 (.401)
- Divisional place: 5th
- Owners: Jerry Colangelo; Ken Kendrick
- General manager: Joe Garagiola Jr.
- Manager: Buck Showalter 1st season
- Television: FSN Arizona; KTVK (3TV) (Thom Brennaman, Greg Schulte, Bob Brenly, Joe Garagiola, Al McCoy)
- Radio: KTAR (620 AM) (Thom Brennaman, Rod Allen, Greg Schulte); KSUN (Spanish) (Jose Tolentino, Ivan Lara)
- Stats: ESPN.com; Baseball Reference

The 1998 Arizona Diamondbacks season was the franchise's 1st season in Major League Baseball and their 1st season at Chase Field in Phoenix, Arizona, as members of the National League West Division. They looked to contend in what was a strong National League West Division. They finished the season 33 games behind the National League Champion San Diego Padres with a record of 65–97, last in the National League West division.

Jeff Suppan was the last player from the inaugural team still active in Major League Baseball when he retired in 2012.

== Offseason ==
- February 7, 1997: Mark Davis was signed as a free agent with the Arizona Diamondbacks.
- August 14, 1997: Mark Davis was sent to the Milwaukee Brewers by the Arizona Diamondbacks as part of a conditional deal.
- November 17, 1997: Jay Bell signed as a free agent with the Arizona Diamondbacks.
- November 18, 1997: Devon White was traded by the Florida Marlins to the Arizona Diamondbacks for Jesus Martinez (minors).
- November 18, 1997: Travis Fryman was traded by the Detroit Tigers to the Arizona Diamondbacks for Gabe Alvarez, Joe Randa, and Matt Drews (minors).
- December 1, 1997: Matt Williams was traded by the Cleveland Indians to the Arizona Diamondbacks for Travis Fryman, Tom Martin, and cash.
- January 8, 1998: Andy Stankiewicz signed as a free agent with the Arizona Diamondbacks.
- January 11, 1998: Mark Davis was signed as a free agent with the Arizona Diamondbacks.

=== Expansion Draft ===
==== Round 1 ====
Pick	Player	Position	From	To
2	Brian Anderson	LHP	Cle	Ari
3	Jeff Suppan	RHP	Bos	Ari
5	Gabe Alvarez	3B	SD	Ari
7	Jorge Fábregas	C	CWS	Ari
9	Karim García	OF	LA	Ari
11	Edwin Diaz	IF	Tex	Ari
13	Cory Lidle	RHP	NYM	Ari
15	Joel Adamson	LHP	Mil	Ari
17	Ben Ford	RHP	NYY	Ari
19	Yamil Benitez	OF	KC	Ari
21	Neil Weber	LHP	Mon	Ari
23	Jason Boyd	RHP	Phi	Ari
25	Brent Brede	OF	Min	Ari
27	Tony Batista	IF	Oak	Ari

==== Round 2 ====
Pick	Player	Position	From	To
29	Tom Martin	LHP	Hou	Ari
31	Omar Daal	LHP	Tor	Ari
33	Scott Winchester	RHP	Cin	Ari
35	Clint Sodowsky	RHP	Pit	Ari
37	Danny Klassen	IF	Mil	Ari
39	Matt Drews	RHP	Det	Ari
41	Todd Erdos	RHP	SD	Ari
43	Chris Clemons	RHP	CWS	Ari
45	David Dellucci	OF	Bal	Ari
47	Damian Miller	C	Min	Ari
49	Héctor Carrasco	RHP	KC	Ari
51	Hanley Frias	SS	Tex	Ari
53	Bob Wolcott	RHP	Sea	Ari
55	Mike Bell	3B	Ana	Ari

==== Round 3 ====
Pick	Player	Position	From	To
57	Joe Randa	3B	Pit	Ari
59	Jesus Martinez	LHP	LA	Ari
61	Russ Springer	RHP	Hou	Ari
63	Bryan Corey	RHP	Det	Ari
65	Kelly Stinnett	C	Mil	Ari
67	Chuck McElroy	LHP	CWS	Ari
69	Marty Janzen	RHP	Tor	Ari

=== 1996–97 MLB June drafts and minor league affiliates ===
The two expansion teams set to debut in 1998, the Diamondbacks and Tampa Bay Devil Rays, had two full seasons to establish scouting and player development systems and were permitted to participate fully in the 1996 and 1997 Major League Baseball drafts. The Diamondbacks drafted 30th in both 1996 and 1997, selecting 62 players (1996) and 60 players (1997) in those drafts. The team began developing those players in a farm system with three minor-league affiliates in 1996 and four in 1997.

Among the players selected and signed by Arizona from those drafts were pitchers Brad Penny (fifth round, 1996) and Casey Fossum (seventh, 1996); infielders Alex Cintrón (36th, 1997), Jack Cust (first, 1997) and Junior Spivey (36th round, 1996); and outfielders Ron Calloway (eighth, 1997) and Jason Conti (32nd, 1996).

==== 1996 farm system ====
Level	Team	League	Manager
A	Visalia Oaks	California League	Tim Torricelli
Rookie	AZL Diamondbacks	Arizona League	Dwayne Murphy
Rookie	Lethbridge Black Diamonds	Pioneer League	Chris Speier

Visalia affiliation shared with Detroit Tigers

==== 1997 farm system ====
Level	Team	League	Manager
A	High Desert Mavericks	California League	Chris Speier
A	South Bend Silver Hawks	Midwest League	Dick Scott
Rookie	AZL Diamondbacks	Arizona League	Brian Butterfield and Don Wakamatsu
Rookie	Lethbridge Black Diamonds	Pioneer League	Tommy Jones

LEAGUE CHAMPIONS: High Desert

== Regular season ==
=== Opening Day starters ===
- Jay Bell
- Andy Benes
- Brent Brede
- Edwin Díaz
- Jorge Fábregas
- Karim García
- Travis Lee
- Devon White
- Matt Williams

=== Season standings ===
NL West
Team	W	L	Pct.	GB	Home	Road
San Diego Padres	98	64	.605	—	54‍–‍27	44‍–‍37
San Francisco Giants	89	74	.546	9½	49‍–‍32	40‍–‍42
Los Angeles Dodgers	83	79	.512	15	48‍–‍33	35‍–‍46
Colorado Rockies	77	85	.475	21	42‍–‍39	35‍–‍46
Arizona Diamondbacks	65	97	.401	33	34‍–‍47	31‍–‍50

==== Record vs. opponents ====
1998 National League record Source: MLB Standings Grid – 1998
Team	AZ	ATL	CHC	CIN	COL	FLA	HOU	LAD	MIL	MON	NYM	PHI	PIT	SD	SF	STL	AL
Arizona	—	1–8	5–7	4–5	6–6	6–2	4–5	4–8	6–3	2–7	4–5	2–7	6–3	3–9	5–7	2–7	5–8
Atlanta	8–1	—	3–6	7–2	5–3	7–5	4–5	8–1	7–2	6–6	9–3	8–4	7–2	5–4	7–2	6–3	9–7
Chicago	7–5	6–3	—	6–5	7–2	7–2	4–7	4–5	6–6	7–2	4–5	3–6	8–3	5–4	7–3	4–7	5–8
Cincinnati	5–4	2–7	5–6	—	4–5	9–0	3–8	5–4	6–5	8–1	3–6	4–5	5–7	1–11	2–7	8–3	7-6
Colorado	6–6	3–5	2–7	5–4	—	6–3	6–5	6–6	4–7	7–2	3–6	5–4	5–4	5–7	7–5	3–6	4–8
Florida	2–6	5–7	2–7	0–9	3–6	—	3–6	4–5	0–9	5–7	5–7	6–6	3–6	4–5	0–9	4–5	8–8
Houston	5–4	5–4	7–4	8–3	5–6	6–3	—	3–6	9–2	7–2	5–4	7–2	9–2	5–4	6–3	5–7	10–4
Los Angeles	8–4	1–8	5–4	4–5	6–6	5–4	6–3	—	5–4	5–4	3–5	5–4	7–5	5–7	6–6	4–5	8–5
Milwaukee	3–6	2–7	6–6	5–6	7–4	9–0	2–9	4–5	—	6–3	1–8	4–5	6–5	3–6	5–4	3–8	8–6
Montreal	7–2	6–6	2–7	1–8	2–7	7–5	2–7	4–5	3–6	—	8–4	5–7	2–7	4–4	3–6	3–6	6–10
New York	5–4	3–9	5–4	6–3	6–3	7–5	4–5	5–3	8–1	4–8	—	8–4	4–5	4–5	4–5	6–3	9–7
Philadelphia	7-2	4–8	6–3	5–4	4–5	6–6	2–7	4–5	5–4	7–5	4–8	—	8–1	1–8	2–6	3–6	7–9
Pittsburgh	3–6	2–7	3–8	7–5	4–5	6–3	2–9	5–7	5–6	7–2	5–4	1–8	—	5–4	2–7	6–5	6–7
San Diego	9–3	4–5	4–5	11–1	7–5	5–4	4–5	7–5	6–3	4–4	5–4	8–1	4–5	—	8–4	6–3	6–7
San Francisco	7–5	2–7	3–7	7–2	5–7	9–0	3–6	6–6	4–5	6–3	5–4	6–2	7–2	4–8	—	7–5	8–5
St. Louis	7–2	3–6	7–4	3–8	6–3	5-4	7–5	5–4	8–3	6–3	3–6	6–3	5–6	3–6	5–7	—	4–9

=== Notable transactions ===
- June 23, 1998: Alan Embree was traded by the Atlanta Braves to the Arizona Diamondbacks for Russ Springer.
- June 26, 1998: Aaron Small was selected off waivers by the Arizona Diamondbacks from the Oakland Athletics.

=== Roster ===
1998 Arizona Diamondbacks
Roster
Pitchers: 38 Joel Adamson; 34 Brian Anderson; 46 Willie Banks; 40 Andy Benes; 19 Willie Blair; 46 Scott Brow; 57 Bobby Chouinard; 49 Bryan Corey; 37 Omar Daal; 32 Alan Embree; 50 Ben Ford; 39 Barry Manuel; 48 Chris Michalak; 67 Vladimir Núñez; 30 Gregg Olson; 57 Ricky Pickett; 47 Félix Rodríguez; 31 Aaron Small; 36 Clint Sodowsky; 31 Russ Springer; 20 Jeff Suppan; 44 Amaury Telemaco; 58 Efrain Valdez; 66 Neil Weber; 29 Bob Wolcott	Catchers: 12 Jorge Fábregas; 26 Damian Miller; 35 Kelly Stinnett; Infielders: 10 Tony Batista; 33 Jay Bell; 41 Edwin Díaz; 6 Andy Fox; 2 Hanley Frias; 7 Danny Klassen; 16 Travis Lee; 5 Andy Stankiewicz; 9 Matt Williams	Outfielders: 43 Yamil Benítez; 15 Brent Brede; 25 David Dellucci; 24 Karim García; 23 Bernard Gilkey; 18 Chris Jones; 29 Hensley Meulens; 22 Devon White; Other batters: 51 Mike Robertson	Manager: 11 Buck Showalter; Coaches: 55 Brian Butterfield (3rd Base); 52 Mark Connor (Pitching); 21 Dwayne Murphy (1st Base); 17 Jim Presley (Hitting); 53 Glenn Sherlock (Bullpen); 14 Carlos Tosca (Bench)

=== Game log ===
1998 Regular Season Game Log (65–97) (Home: 34–47; Road: 31–50)
March/April (7–20) (Home: 4–8; Road: 3–12)

#	Date	Opponent	Score	Win	Loss	Save	Stadium	Attendance	Record	Streak
1	March 31	Rockies	2–9	Kile (1–0)	Benes (0–1)	—	Bank One Ballpark	47,484	0–1	L1
2	April 1	Rockies	0–6	Thomson (1–0)	Blair (0–1)	—	Bank One Ballpark	43,758	0–2	L2
3	April 2	Rockies	4–6	Astacio (1–0)	Anderson (0–1)	Dipoto (1)	Bank One Ballpark	42,876	0–3	L3
4	April 3	Giants	3–8	Gardner (1–0)	Suppan (0–1)	—	Bank One Ballpark	45,590	0–4	L4
5	April 4	Giants	3–5	Darwin (1–0)	Olson (0–1)	Nen (1)	Bank One Ballpark	47,047	0–5	L5
6	April 5	Giants	3–2	Benes (1–1)	Estes (0–1)	Rodriguez (1)	Bank One Ballpark	47,593	1–5	W1
7	April 7	@ Dodgers	1–9	Park (1–0)	Blair (0–2)	—	Dodger Stadium	52,424	1–6	L1
8	April 8	@ Dodgers	3–0	Anderson (1–1)	Nomo (0–1)	Rodriguez (2)	Dodger Stadium	37,016	2–6	W1
9	April 9	@ Dodgers	2–7	Valdez (1–1)	Suppan (0–2)	—	Dodger Stadium	39,541	2–7	L1
10	April 10	@ Padres	4–6	Miceli (1–0)	Rodriguez (0–1)	—	Qualcomm Stadium	27,243	2–8	L2
11	April 11	@ Padres	0–7	Smith (1–0)	Adamson (0–1)	—	Qualcomm Stadium	37,753	2–9	L3
12	April 12	@ Padres	2–4	Hamilton (2–0)	Blair (0–3)	Hoffman (3)	Qualcomm Stadium	26,217	2–10	L4
13	April 13	@ Padres	0–1	Ashby (2–1)	Anderson (1–2)	—	Qualcomm Stadium	36,278	2–11	L5
14	April 14	@ Cardinals	5–15	Busby (2–0)	Sodowsky (0–1)	—	Busch Memorial Stadium	31,477	2–12	L6
–	April 15	@ Cardinals	Postponed (rain, makeup April 16)							
15	April 16 (1)	@ Cardinals	4–5	Stottlemyre (2–0)	Adamson (0–2)	Brantley (3)	Busch Memorial Stadium	N/A	2–13	L7
16	April 16 (2)	@ Cardinals	8–2	Benes (2–1)	Osborne (0–1)	—	Busch Memorial Stadium	32,039	3–13	W1
17	April 17	Marlins	7–5	Springer (1–0)	Darensbourg (0–1)	Rodriguez (3)	Bank One Ballpark	47,401	4–13	W2
18	April 18	Marlins	7–5	Manuel (1–0)	Alfonseca (0–1)	Rodriguez (4)	Bank One Ballpark	46,910	5–13	W3
19	April 19	Marlins	3–4	Meadows (2–2)	Suppan (0–3)	Stanifer (1)	Bank One Ballpark	47,339	5–14	L1
20	April 20	Marlins	15–4	Sodowsky (1–1)	Hernandez (2–2)	—	Bank One Ballpark	45,256	6–14	W1
21	April 22	@ Braves	2–5	Smoltz (2–0)	Benes (2–2)	—	Turner Field	30,952	6–15	L1
22	April 23	@ Braves	1–3	Glavine (3–0)	Blair (0–4)	Wohlers (6)	Turner Field	33,013	6–16	L2
23	April 24	@ Braves	5–6	Ligtenberg (2–1)	Springer (1–1)	—	Turner Field	41,514	6–17	L3
24	April 25	@ Marlins	4–3 (11)	Brow (1–0)	Darensbourg (0–2)	Rodriguez (5)	Pro Player Stadium	28,710	7–17	W1
25	April 26	@ Marlins	6–12	Ludwick (1–2)	Adamson (0–3)	—	Pro Player Stadium	24,782	7–18	L1
26	April 27	Braves	5–6	Cather (1–1)	Daal (0–1)	Wohlers (7)	Bank One Ballpark	47,410	7–19	L2
27	April 28	Braves	2–12	Glavine (4–0)	Blair (0–5)	—	Bank One Ballpark	47,593	7–20	L3

May (10–19) (Home: 6–8; Road: 4–11)

#	Date	Opponent	Score	Win	Loss	Save	Stadium	Attendance	Record	Streak
28	May 1	@ Expos	4–7	Vasquez (1–2)	Anderson (1–3)	Urbina (6)	Olympic Stadium	6,952	7–21	L4
29	May 2	@ Expos	4–5 (12)	Bennett (1–1)	Springer (1–2)	—	Olympic Stadium	8,026	7–22	L5
30	May 3	@ Expos	1–4	Hermanson (3–2)	Blair (0–6)	—	Olympic Stadium	10,467	7–23	L6
31	May 4	@ Mets	4–2 (11)	Olson (1–1)	Bohanon (0–1)	—	Shea Stadium	18,980	8–23	W1
32	May 5	@ Mets	1–9	Mlicki (1–3)	Daal (0–2)	—	Shea Stadium	13,205	8–24	L1
33	May 6	@ Mets	2–8	Rojas (2–0)	Sodowsky (1–2)	—	Shea Stadium	17,681	8–25	L2
34	May 7	@ Phillies	1–4	Schilling (4–3)	Benes (2–3)	Leiter (3)	Veterans Stadium	13,838	8–26	L3
35	May 8	@ Phillies	4–6	Green (3–2)	Olson (1–2)	Leiter (4)	Veterans Stadium	13,259	8–27	L4
–	May 9	@ Phillies	Postponed (rain, makeup August 20)							
36	May 10	@ Phillies	4–7	Winston (1–0)	Suppan (0–4)	Leiter (5)	Veterans Stadium	18,520	8–28	L5
37	May 11	Cubs	2–4	Wood (4–2)	Anderson (1–4)	Beck (10)	Bank One Ballpark	47,129	8–29	L6
38	May 12	Cubs	6–7	Adams (2–1)	Rodriguez (0–2)	Beck (11)	Bank One Ballpark	45,240	8–30	L7
39	May 13	Brewers	3–8	Juden (5–1)	Blair (0–7)	Wickman (1)	Bank One Ballpark	40,230	8–31	L8
40	May 14	Brewers	4–1	Springer (2–2)	Eldred (0–3)	Olson (1)	Bank One Ballpark	40,204	9–31	W1
41	May 15	Pirates	6–1	Suppan (1–4)	Cordova (4–3)	—	Bank One Ballpark	43,584	10–31	W2
42	May 16	Pirates	3–6	Schmidt (6–1)	Anderson (1–5)	Loiselle (9)	Bank One Ballpark	48,167	10–32	L1
43	May 17	Pirates	8–2	Benes (3–3)	Loaiza (2–2)	—	Bank One Ballpark	44,014	11–32	W1
44	May 18	Pirates	9–2	Blair (1–7)	Lieber (1–6)	—	Bank One Ballpark	41,465	12–32	W2
45	May 20	@ Marlins	7–3	Daal (1–2)	Larkin (2–4)	Olson (2)	Pro Player Stadium	17,560	13–32	W3
46	May 21	@ Marlins	6–4	Telemaco (2–1)	Darensbourg (0–6)	Olson (3)	Pro Player Stadium	15,116	14–32	W4
47	May 22	Dodgers	0–5	Dreifort (2–4)	Benes (3–4)	—	Bank One Ballpark	48,299	14–33	L1
48	May 23	Dodgers	1–7	Martinez (6–2)	Anderson (1–6)	—	Bank One Ballpark	48,369	14–34	L2
49	May 24	Dodgers	8–5	Blair (2–7)	Park (4–3)	Olson (4)	Bank One Ballpark	48,682	15–34	W1
50	May 25	Padres	3–2	Springer (3–2)	Ashby (5–4)	Olson (5)	Bank One Ballpark	45,367	16–34	W2
51	May 26	Padres	1–12	Brown (4–3)	Suppan (1–5)	—	Bank One Ballpark	41,204	16–35	L1
52	May 27	Padres	4–6	Wall (2–1)	Benes (3–5)	Hoffman (15)	Bank One Ballpark	42,844	16–36	L2
53	May 28	@ Giants	8–7	Anderson (2–6)	Darwin (4–3)	Olson (6)	3Com Park	12,066	17–36	W1
54	May 29	@ Giants	1–3	Estes (4–5)	Blair (2–8)	Nen (13)	3Com Park	16,859	17–37	L1
55	May 30	@ Giants	1–4	Hershiser (5–3)	Daal (1–3)	Nen (14)	3Com Park	28,185	17–38	L2
56	May 31	@ Giants	4–7	Rueter (7–3)	Suppan (1–6)	—	3Com Park	35,800	17–39	L3

June (12–15) (Home: 4–7; Road: 8–8)

#	Date	Opponent	Score	Win	Loss	Save	Stadium	Attendance	Record	Streak
57	June 1	@ Rockies	6–4	Benes (4–5)	Kile (5–7)	Olson (7)	Coors Field	48,020	18–39	W1
58	June 2	@ Rockies	9–3	Anderson (3–6)	Wright (4–6)	—	Coors Field	47,905	19–39	W2
59	June 3	@ Rockies	2–3	McElroy (2–1)	Olson (1–3)	—	Coors Field	46,279	19–40	L1
60	June 4	@ Rockies	2–5	Thomson (5–5)	Daal (1–4)	—	Coors Field	46,295	19–41	L2
61	June 5	@ Athletics	1–2 (11)	Mohler (1–2)	Springer (3–3)	—	Oakland-Alameda County Coliseum	9,082	19–42	L3
62	June 6	@ Athletics	5–10	Oquist (3–3)	Benes (4–6)	—	Oakland-Alameda County Coliseum	18,458	19–43	L4
63	June 7	@ Athletics	12–4	Anderson (4–6)	Candiotti (4–7)	—	Oakland-Alameda County Coliseum	17,420	20–43	W1
64	June 9	Angels	8–10	Finley (7–2)	Sodowsky (1–3)	Percival (18)	Bank One Ballpark	43,074	20–44	L1
65	June 10	Angels	10–2	Daal (2–4)	Hill (8–5)	—	Bank One Ballpark	40,819	21–44	W1
66	June 11	Angels	5–10	Dickson (6–4)	Wolcott (0–1)	Percival (19)	Bank One Ballpark	41,954	21–45	L1
67	June 12	Cardinals	4–9	Stottlemyre (7–5)	Benes (4–7)	—	Bank One Ballpark	48,169	21–46	L2
68	June 13	Cardinals	7–4	Springer (4–3)	Brantley (0–3)	Olson (8)	Bank One Ballpark	48,172	22–46	W1
69	June 14	Cardinals	0–2	Petkovsek (4–3)	Blair (2–9)	Bottenfield (4)	Bank One Ballpark	48,166	22–47	L1
70	June 16	@ Reds	5–1	Daal (3–4)	Harnisch (6–2)	—	Cinergy Field	15,975	23–47	W1
71	June 17	@ Reds	4–1	Benes (5–7)	Remlinger (4–8)	Olson (9)	Cinergy Field	20,029	24–47	W2
72	June 18	@ Reds	4–2	Anderson (5–6)	Klingenbeck (1–2)	Olson (10)	Cinergy Field	21,944	25–47	W3
73	June 19	@ Cardinals	0–5	Petkovsek (5–3)	Blair (2–10)	—	Busch Memorial Stadium	44,949	25–48	L1
74	June 20	@ Cardinals	2–4	Aybar (3–3)	Banks (1–2)	Croushore (2)	Busch Memorial Stadium	47,632	25–49	L2
75	June 21	@ Cardinals	4–5	Raggio (1–1)	Sodowsky (1–4)	Brantley (11)	Busch Memorial Stadium	45,517	25–50	L3
76	June 22	@ Rangers	6–0	Benes (6–7)	Burkett (4–8)	—	The Ballpark in Arlington	37,840	26–50	W1
77	June 23	@ Rangers	5–16	Sele (11–4)	Anderson (5–7)	—	The Ballpark in Arlington	31,904	26–51	L1
78	June 24	Rangers	2–3	Helling (11–3)	Blair (2–11)	Wetteland (21)	Bank One Ballpark	44,296	26–52	L2
79	June 25	Rangers	4–9	Van Poppel (1–1)	Telemaco (2–2)	—	Bank One Ballpark	44,269	26–53	L3
80	June 26	Mariners	13–8	Sodowsky (2–4)	Spoljaric (3–2)	—	Bank One Ballpark	49,328	27–53	W1
81	June 27	Mariners	4–6	Fassero (6–5)	Benes (6–8)	Slocumb (3)	Bank One Ballpark	48,488	27–54	L1
82	June 28	Mariners	3–2	Embree (2–0)	Ayala (0–6)	—	Bank One Ballpark	47,968	28–54	W1
83	June 30	@ Cubs	5–4	Blair (3–11)	Clark (4–8)	Olson (11)	Wrigley Field	39,307	29–54	W2

July (11–15) (Home: 7–6; Road: 4–9)

#	Date	Opponent	Score	Win	Loss	Save	Stadium	Attendance	Record	Streak
84	July 1	@ Cubs	4–6	Wood (8–3)	Telemaco (2–3)	Beck (19)	Wrigley Field	31,002	29–55	L1
85	July 2	@ Cubs	2–3	Trachsel (7–5)	Suppan (1–7)	Beck (20)	Wrigley Field	29,268	29–56	L2
86	July 3	@ Astros	5–6	Reynolds (10–5)	Benes (6–9)	Wagner (19)	Astrodome	34,382	29–57	L3
87	July 4	@ Astros	7–4	Anderson (6–7)	Hampton (8–4)	—	Astrodome	31,477	30–57	W1
88	July 5	@ Astros	2–5	Bergman (8–4)	Blair (3–12)	Wagner (20)	Astrodome	23,607	30–58	L1
–	July 7	69th All-Star Game	AL defeats NL 13–8 at Coors Field							
89	July 10	Reds	4–5	Tomko (9–6)	Benes (6–10)	—	Bank One Ballpark	45,278	30–59	L2
90	July 11	Reds	0–8	Remlinger (6–9)	Blair (3–13)	—	Bank One Ballpark	47,323	30–60	L3
91	July 12	Reds	3–5	Hudek (2–4)	Anderson (6–8)	—	Bank One Ballpark	42,329	30–61	L4
92	July 13	Astros	5–3	Telemaco (3–3)	Schourek (5–6)	Olson (12)	Bank One Ballpark	40,007	31–61	W1
93	July 14	Astros	2–4	Reynolds (12–5)	Daal (3–5)	Wagner (22)	Bank One Ballpark	40,419	31–62	L1
94	July 15	Astros	9–8 (11)	Embree (3–0)	Magnante (3–4)	—	Bank One Ballpark	42,229	32–62	W1
95	July 17	Rockies	9–6	Blair (4–13)	Astacio (7–10)	Olson (13)	Bank One Ballpark	46,322	33–62	W2
96	July 18	Rockies	4–2	Anderson (7–8)	Jones (3–4)	Olson (14)	Bank One Ballpark	48,527	34–62	W3
97	July 19	Rockies	6–4	Small (2–1)	Munoz (2–1)	Embree (1)	Bank One Ballpark	45,650	35–62	W4
98	July 20	@ Giants	3–5	Rodriguez (2–0)	Chouinard (0–1)	Nen (27)	3Com Park	15,550	35–63	L1
99	July 21	@ Giants	5–3	Benes (7–10)	Hershiser (8–8)	Olson (15)	3Com Park	12,433	36–63	W1
100	July 22	@ Padres	3–9	Ashby (14–5)	Blair (4–14)	—	Qualcomm Stadium	18,780	36–64	L1
101	July 23	@ Padres	0–3	Hamilton (9–9)	Anderson (7–9)	Hoffman (32)	Qualcomm Stadium	24,278	36–65	L2
102	July 24	@ Dodgers	1–3	Park (9–5)	Telemaco (3–4)	Shaw (29)	Dodger Stadium	36,150	36–66	L3
103	July 25	@ Dodgers	5–3	Daal (4–5)	Dreifort (6–9)	Olson (16)	Dodger Stadium	38,937	37–66	W1
104	July 26	@ Dodgers	3–5	Valdez (9–9)	Benes (7–11)	Shaw (30)	Dodger Stadium	37,353	37–67	L1
105	July 27	Cubs	2–6	Trachsel (10–5)	Blair (4–15)	—	Bank One Ballpark	46,373	37–68	L2
106	July 28	Cubs	7–5	Wolcott (1–1)	Clark (6–10)	Olson (17)	Bank One Ballpark	47,190	38–68	W1
107	July 29	Cubs	3–7	Wengert (1–0)	Telemaco (3–5)	Adams (1)	Bank One Ballpark	46,738	38–69	L1
108	July 30	Cubs	4–0	Daal (5–5)	Tapani (12–7)	—	Bank One Ballpark	46,728	39–69	W1
109	July 31	@ Brewers	8–2	Benes (8–11)	Juden (7–10)	—	County Stadium	27,274	40–69	W2

August (13–16) (Home: 6–9; Road: 7–7)

#	Date	Opponent	Score	Win	Loss	Save	Stadium	Attendance	Record	Streak
110	August 1	@ Brewers	5–4	Banks (2–2)	Fox (0–2)	Olson (18)	County Stadium	24,370	41–69	W3
111	August 2	@ Brewers	2–7	Woodall (5–5)	Anderson (7–10)	—	County Stadium	29,457	41–70	L1
112	August 3	@ Cubs	6–5	Telemaco (4–5)	Wengert (1–1)	Olson (19)	Wrigley Field	38,551	42–70	W1
113	August 4	@ Cubs	0–2	Tapani (13–7)	Daal (5–6)	Beck (33)	Wrigley Field	37,539	42–71	L1
114	August 5	@ Cubs	10–7	Benes (9–11)	Wood (11–6)	Olson (20)	Wrigley Field	39,664	43–71	W1
115	August 7	@ Expos	6–4	Anderson (8–10)	Vasquez (3–11)	Olson (21)	Olympic Stadium	9,798	44–71	W2
116	August 8	@ Expos	3–5	Hermanson (10–9)	Telemaco (4–6)	Urbina (26)	Olympic Stadium	10,717	44–72	L1
117	August 9	@ Expos	2–8	Bennett (5–4)	Wolcott (1–2)	Kline (1)	Olympic Stadium	21,804	44–73	L2
118	August 10	Phillies	0–3	Schilling (11–11)	Daal (5–7)	—	Bank One Ballpark	41,711	44–74	L3
119	August 11	Phillies	7–3	Benes (10–11)	Portugal (6–3)	—	Bank One Ballpark	41,298	45–74	W1
120	August 12	Phillies	4–7	Grace (4–5)	Anderson (8–11)	M. Leiter (21)	Bank One Ballpark	41,510	45–75	L1
121	August 14	Mets	2–3	Reed (14–7)	Telemaco (4–7)	Wendell (1)	Bank One Ballpark	47,562	45–76	L2
122	August 15	Mets	4–5	Reynoso (4–0)	Chouinard (0–2)	Franco (25)	Bank One Ballpark	48,307	45–77	L3
123	August 16	Mets	6–1	Daal (6–7)	Nomo (5–10)	—	Bank One Ballpark	44,537	46–77	W1
124	August 17	Expos	6–1	Benes (11–11)	Powell (1–3)	—	Bank One Ballpark	39,367	47–77	W2
125	August 18	Expos	1–7	Vasquez (4–12)	Anderson (8–12)	—	Bank One Ballpark	40,012	47–78	L1
126	August 19	Expos	2–8	Hermanson (11–9)	Telemaco (4–8)	—	Bank One Ballpark	39,906	47–79	L2
127	August 20 (1)	@ Phillies	1–11	Schilling (12–11)	Wolcott (1–3)	—	Veterans Stadium	N/A	47–80	L3
128	August 20 (2)	@ Phillies	12–9 (11)	Embree (4–0)	Bottalico (1–3)	—	Veterans Stadium	26,216	48–80	W1
129	August 21	@ Phillies	0–1	Portugal (8–3)	Daal (6–8)	Gomes (1)	Veterans Stadium	17,144	48–81	L1
130	August 22	@ Mets	4–9	Jones (9–7)	Benes (11–12)	—	Shea Stadium	42,654	48–82	L2
131	August 23	@ Mets	4–3	Anderson (9–12)	A. Leiter (12–5)	Olson (22)	Shea Stadium	36,039	49–82	W1
132	August 24	@ Mets	9–5	Telemaco (5–8)	Yoshii (5–7)	Banks (1)	Shea Stadium	29,850	50–82	W2
133	August 25	Pirates	6–9	Lawrence (1–0)	Sodowsky (2–5)	Loiselle (16)	Bank One Ballpark	38,960	50–83	L1
134	August 26	Pirates	3–4	Tabaka (2–1)	Daal (6–9)	Loiselle (17)	Bank One Ballpark	39,906	50–84	L2
135	August 27	Brewers	0–4	Roque (2–1)	Benes (11–13)	Plunk (1)	Bank One Ballpark	40,856	50–85	L3
136	August 28	Brewers	6–3	Anderson (10–12)	Woodall (6–8)	Olson (23)	Bank One Ballpark	41,505	51–85	W1
137	August 29	Brewers	4–3	Small (3–1)	Wickman (6–8)	—	Bank One Ballpark	44,920	52–85	W2
138	August 30	Brewers	7–3	Sodowsky (3–5)	Karl (9–8)	—	Bank One Ballpark	40,508	53–85	W3

September (12–12) (Home: 7–9; Road: 5–3)

#	Date	Opponent	Score	Win	Loss	Save	Stadium	Attendance	Record	Streak
139	September 1	@ Pirates	4–3	Daal (7–9)	Peters (7–9)	Olson (24)	Three Rivers Stadium	11,427	54–85	W4
140	September 2	@ Pirates	2–1 (11)	Small (4–1)	Tabaka (2–2)	Olson (25)	Three Rivers Stadium	12,010	55–85	W5
141	September 3	@ Pirates	1–0	Anderson (11–12)	Cordova (12–12)	—	Three Rivers Stadium	8,610	56–85	W6
142	September 4	Astros	3–1	Telemaco (6–8)	Lima (14–7)	Olson (26)	Bank One Ballpark	41,396	57–85	W7
143	September 5	Astros	5–6 (12)	Wagner (4–3)	Embree (4–1)	—	Bank One Ballpark	43,638	57–86	L1
144	September 6	Astros	1–10	Hampton (11–6)	Daal (7–10)	—	Bank One Ballpark	44,076	57–87	L2
145	September 7	Dodgers	4–2	Benes (12–13)	Mlicki (8–7)	Olson (27)	Bank One Ballpark	43,316	58–87	W1
146	September 8	Dodgers	5–6 (11)	Kubenka (1–0)	Embree (4–2)	Shaw (41)	Bank One Ballpark	40,262	58–88	L1
147	September 9	Dodgers	2–6	Perez (9–13)	Telemaco (6–9)	—	Bank One Ballpark	41,092	58–89	L2
148	September 11	@ Reds	1–13	Tomko (12–11)	Sodowsky (3–6)	—	Cinergy Field	16,579	58–90	L3
149	September 12	@ Reds	0–3	Parris (5–4)	Daal (7–11)	White (6)	Cinergy Field	17,463	58–91	L4
150	September 13	@ Reds	5–0	Benes (13–13)	Bere (4–9)	Olson (28)	Cinergy Field	17,741	59–91	W1
151	September 14	Giants	14–2	Anderson (12–12)	Estes (7–11)	—	Bank One Ballpark	39,715	60–91	W2
152	September 15	Giants	7–6 (11)	Olson (2–3)	Mesa (8–7)	—	Bank One Ballpark	41,619	61–91	W3
153	September 16	Giants	5–6 (10)	Johnstone (5–5)	Olson (2–4)	Nen (37)	Bank One Ballpark	40,547	61–92	L1
154	September 17	Braves	0–1	Neagle (15–11)	Daal (7–12)	Ligtenberg (29)	Bank One Ballpark	43,251	61–93	L2
155	September 18	Braves	5–0	Benes (14–13)	Maddux (17–9)	—	Bank One Ballpark	46,434	62–93	W1
156	September 19	Braves	0–5	Glavine (20–6)	Anderson (12–13)	—	Bank One Ballpark	48,405	62–94	L1
157	September 20	Braves	0–10	Chen (2–0)	Telemaco (6–10)	—	Bank One Ballpark	44,876	62–95	L2
158	September 22	@ Rockies	8–6	Daal (8–12)	Wright (9–14)	Olson (29)	Coors Field	42,859	63–95	W1
159	September 23	@ Rockies	11–14	Wainhouse (1–0)	Banks (2–3)	Veres (8)	Coors Field	44,021	63–96	L1
160	September 25	Padres	6–3	Olson (3–4)	Myers (4–7)	—	Bank One Ballpark	47,288	64–96	W1
161	September 26	Padres	3–2	Telemaco (7–10)	Hitchcock (9–7)	Olson (30)	Bank One Ballpark	48,196	65–96	W2
162	September 27	Padres	2–3	Clement (2–0)	Small (4–2)	Hoffman (53)	Bank One Ballpark	48,390	65–97	L1

Legend: = Win = Loss = Postponement

== Player stats ==
= Indicates team leader

=== Batting ===
==== Starters by position ====
Note: Pos = Position; G = Games played; AB = At bats; H = Hits; HR = Home runs; RBI = Runs batted in; Avg. = Batting average

Pos	Player	G	AB	H	HR	RBI	Avg.
C	Kelly Stinnett	92	274	71	11	34	.259
1B	Travis Lee	146	562	151	22	72	.269
2B	Andy Fox	139	502	139	9	44	.277
3B	Matt Williams	135	510	136	20	71	.267
SS	Jay Bell	155	549	138	20	67	.251
LF	David Dellucci	124	416	108	5	51	.260
CF	Devon White	146	563	157	22	85	.279
RF	Karim García	113	333	74	9	43	.222

==== Other batters ====
Note: G = Games played; AB = At bats; H = Hits; HR = Home runs; RBI = Runs batted in; Avg. = Batting average

Player	G	AB	H	HR	RBI	Avg.
Tony Batista	106	293	80	18	41	.273
Brent Brede	98	212	48	2	17	.226
Yamil Benítez	91	206	41	9	30	.199
Damian Miller	57	168	48	3	14	.286
Jorge Fábregas	50	151	30	1	15	.199
Andy Stankiewicz	77	145	30	0	8	.207
Danny Klassen	29	108	21	3	8	.194
Bernard Gilkey	29	101	25	1	5	.248
Chris Jones	20	31	6	0	3	.194
Hanley Frías	15	23	3	1	1	.130
Hensley Meulens	7	15	1	1	1	.067
Mike Robertson	11	13	2	0	0	.154
Edwin Díaz	3	7	0	0	0	.000

=== Pitching ===
==== Starting pitchers ====
Note: G = Games pitched; IP = Innings pitched; W = Wins; L = Losses; ERA = Earned run average; SO = Strikeouts; BB = Walks allowed

Player	G	IP	W	L	ERA	SO	BB
Andy Benes	34	231.1	14	13	3.97	164	74
Brian Anderson	32	208.0	12	13	4.33	95	24
Omar Daal	33	162.2	8	12	2.88	132	51
Willie Blair	23	146.2	4	15	5.34	71	51
Jeff Suppan	13	66.0	6	9	6.68	39	21
Bob Wolcott	6	33.0	1	3	7.09	21	13
Joel Adamson	5	23.0	0	3	8.22	14	11

==== Other pitchers ====
Note: G = Games pitched; IP = Innings pitched; W = Wins; L = Losses; ERA = Earned run average; SO = Strikeouts; BB = Walks allowed

Player	G	IP	W	L	ERA	SO	BB
Amaury Telemaco	27	121.0	6	9	3.94	60	33

==== Relief pitchers ====
Note: G = Games pitched; IP = Innings pitched; W = Wins; L = Losses; SV = Saves; ERA = Earned run average; SO = Strikeouts; BB = Walks allowed

Player	G	IP	W	L	SV	ERA	SO	BB
Gregg Olson	64	68.2	3	4	30	3.01	55	25
Clint Sodowsky	45	77.2	3	6	0	5.68	42	39
Félix Rodríguez	43	44.0	0	2	5	6.14	36	29
Alan Embree	35	35.0	3	2	1	4.11	24	13
Willie Banks	33	43.2	1	2	1	3.09	32	25
Bobby Chouinard	26	38.1	0	2	0	4.23	26	11
Russ Springer	26	32.2	4	3	0	4.13	37	14
Aaron Small	23	31.2	3	1	0	3.69	14	8
Scott Brow	17	21.1	1	0	0	7.17	13	14
Barry Manuel	13	15.2	1	0	0	7.47	12	14
Ben Ford	8	10.0	0	0	0	9.90	5	3
Efraín Valdez	6	4.1	0	0	0	4.15	2	1
Chris Michalak	5	5.1	0	0	0	11.81	5	4
Vladimir Núñez	4	5.1	0	0	0	10.13	2	2
Neil Weber	4	2.1	0	0	0	11.57	4	3
Bryan Corey	3	4.0	0	0	0	9.00	1	2
Ricky Pickett	2	0.2	0	0	0	81.00	2	4

== Farm system ==
Level	Team	League	Manager
AAA	Tucson Sidewinders	Pacific Coast League	Chris Speier
A	High Desert Mavericks	California League	Don Wakamatsu
A	South Bend Silver Hawks	Midwest League	Roly de Armas
Rookie	AZL Diamondbacks	Arizona League	Mike Brumley
Rookie	Lethbridge Black Diamonds	Pioneer League	Joe Almaraz
