= Arizona Diamondbacks all-time roster =

List of baseball players

The following is a list of past and current players who have played in at least one game for the Arizona Diamondbacks franchise. Players in Bold are members of the National Baseball Hall of Fame.

== A ==
- Philip Abner
- Tony Abreu
- Austin Adams
- Joel Adamson
- Miguel Aguilar
- Nick Ahmed
- Jonathan Albaladejo
- Matt Albers
- Sergio Alcántara
- Blaze Alexander
- Brandon Allen
- Logan Allen
- Armando Almanza
- Abraham Almonte
- **Roberto Alomar**
- Brian Anderson
- Chase Anderson
- Matt Andriese
- Greg Aquino
- Nolan Arenado
- Bronson Arroyo
- Bryan Augenstein
- Alex Avila

== B ==
- Kyle Backhus
- Carlos Baerga
- Jeff Bajenaru
- Luken Baker
- Anthony Banda
- Willie Banks
- Rod Barajas
- Brian Barden
- Tucker Barnhart
- Jake Barrett
- Jorge Barrosa
- Miguel Batista
- Tony Batista
- Trevor Bauer
- Danny Bautista
- Jeremy Beasley
- Jalen Beeks
- Seth Beer
- Heath Bell
- Jay Bell
- Josh Bell
- Andy Benes
- Yamil Benitez
- Kris Benson
- Travis Bergen
- Brad Bergesen
- Nick Bierbrodt
- Willie Blair
- Gregor Blanco
- Henry Blanco
- Willie Bloomquist
- Geoff Blum
- Mike Bolsinger
- Emilio Bonifacio
- Ricky Bottalico
- Michael Bourn
- Matt Bowman
- Brad Boxberger
- Blaine Boyer
- Silvino Bracho
- Archie Bradley
- Russell Branyan
- Mitch Bratt
- Yhency Brazobán
- Brent Brede
- Craig Breslow
- Charles Brewer
- Jeff Brigham
- Juan Brito
- Socrates Brito
- Troy Brohawn
- Scott Brow
- Brian Bruney
- Ryan Buchter
- Billy Buckner
- J. B. Bukauskas
- Jason Bulger
- Madison Bumgarner
- Enrique Burgos
- Juan Burgos
- Chris Burke
- Corbin Burnes
- Sean Burroughs
- Matt Buschmann
- Eric Byrnes

== C ==
- Alex Cabrera
- Asdrúbal Cabrera
- Daniel Cabrera
- José Cabrera
- Trevor Cahill
- Kole Calhoun
- Alberto Callaspo
- Tony Campana
- Vicente Campos
- Dominic Canzone
- Chris Capuano
- Luke Carlin
- Dan Carlson
- D. J. Carrasco
- Gerardo Carrillo
- Corbin Carroll
- Humberto Castellanos
- Alberto Castillo
- Diego Castillo
- José Castillo
- Welington Castillo
- Miguel Castro
- Slade Cecconi
- Jhoulys Chacín
- Andrew Chafin
- Eric Chavez
- Randy Choate
- Bobby Chouinard
- Ryan Christenson
- Ryan Church
- Alex Cintrón
- Jeff Cirillo
- Tony Clark
- Taylor Clarke
- Royce Clayton
- Tyler Clippard
- Greg Colbrunn
- Josh Collmenter
- Jason Conti
- Ryan Cook
- Patrick Corbin
- Bryan Corey
- Lance Cormier
- Craig Counsell
- Collin Cowgill
- Stefan Crichton
- Nabil Crismatt
- Kevin Cron
- Bobby Crosby
- José Cruz Jr.
- Juan Cruz
- Midre Cummings
- Zac Curtis
- John Curtiss
- Jack Cust

== D ==
- Jamie D'Antona
- Omar Daal
- Casey Daigle
- Jeff DaVanon
- Matt Davidson
- Zach Davies
- Doug Davis
- Brett de Geus
- Eury De La Rosa
- Jorge De La Rosa
- Rubby De La Rosa
- Adrian Del Castillo
- Randall Delgado
- David Dellucci
- Sam Demel
- Daniel Descalso
- Anthony DeSclafani
- Elmer Dessens
- Chris Devenski
- Doug DeVore
- Edwin Diaz
- Yilber Diaz
- Jake Diekman
- Mike DiFelice
- Wilmer Difo
- Chris Donnels
- Danny Dorn
- Kyle Drabek
- Kohl Drake
- Stephen Drew
- Brandon Drury
- Zach Duke
- Adam Dunn
- Jon Duplantier
- Erubiel Durazo
- Chad Durbin
- J. D. Durbin

== E ==
- Damion Easley
- Adam Eaton
- David Eckstein
- Drew Ellis
- Robert Ellis
- Jake Elmore
- Alan Embree
- Tristin English
- Barry Enright
- Eduardo Escobar
- Edwin Escobar
- Bobby Estalella
- Shawn Estes
- Johnny Estrada
- Nick Evans
- Dana Eveland

== F ==
- Jorge Fábregas
- Stuart Fairchild
- Jake Faria
- José Fernández
- Jeff Fassero
- Mike Fetters
- J. P. Feyereisen
- Nelson Figueroa
- Steve Finley
- Dominic Fletcher
- Dylan Floro
- Ben Ford
- Casey Fossum
- Andy Fox
- Seth Frankoff
- John Frascatore
- Mike Freeman
- Hanley Frias
- Luis Frías
- Paul Fry
- Rey Fuentes

== G ==
- Armando Galarraga
- Zac Gallen
- Aramis Garcia
- Brandyn Garcia
- Karim García
- Jon Garland
- Stone Garrett
- Jerry Gil
- Tyler Gilbert
- Bernard Gilkey
- Cole Gillespie
- Kevin Ginkel
- Troy Glaus
- Zack Godley
- Paul Goldschmidt
- Edgar González
- Enrique González
- Luis Gonzalez
- Andrew Good
- Tom Gordon
- Tuffy Gosewisch
- Mike Gosling
- Phil Gosselin
- Mark Grace
- Matt Grace
- Tyler Graham
- Kendall Graveman
- Andy Green
- Shawn Green
- Didi Gregorius
- Grayson Greiner
- Zack Greinke
- Randal Grichuk
- Jason Grimsley
- Buddy Groom
- LuJames Groover
- Junior Guerra
- José Guillén
- Lourdes Gurriel Jr.
- Juan Gutiérrez
- Geraldo Guzman

== H ==
- Bradin Hagens
- Jake Hager
- Scott Hairston
- Brad Halsey
- Robby Hammock
- Garrett Hampson
- Mike Hampton
- Dan Haren
- Lenny Harris
- Will Harris
- Steve Hathaway
- Jeremy Hazelbaker
- Nick Heath
- Aaron Heilman
- Jeremy Hellickson
- Rick Helling
- Tommy Henry
- Matt Herges
- Chris Herrmann
- David Hernandez
- Liván Hernández
- Orlando Hernández
- Oscar Hernández
- Yonny Hernández
- José Herrera
- Keith Hessler
- John Hester
- Aaron Hill
- Koyie Hill
- Shea Hillenbrand
- Eric Hinske
- Yoshihisa Hirano
- Andrew Hoffmann
- Bryan Holaday
- Greg Holland
- David Holmberg
- Darren Holmes
- Tyler Holton
- JJ Hoover
- Bob Howry
- Ken Huckaby
- Daniel Hudson
- Orlando Hudson
- Brandon Hughes
- Cooper Hummel

== I ==
- Chris Iannetta
- Ender Inciarte

== J ==
- Brett Jackson
- Conor Jackson
- Edwin Jackson
- Mike Jacobs
- Joe Jacques
- Drey Jameson
- Bryce Jarvis
- Kevin Jarvis
- Jon Jay
- Kyle Jensen
- Chris Johnson
- Kelly Johnson
- **Randy Johnson**
- Chris Jones
- Félix José
- Caleb Joseph
- Jorge Julio

== K ==
- Connor Kaiser
- Matt Kata
- Carson Kelly
- Casey Kelly
- Merrill Kelly
- Buddy Kennedy
- Ian Kennedy
- Joe Kennedy
- Max Kepler
- Dallas Keuchel
- Roger Kieschnick
- Byung-hyun Kim
- Patrick Kivlehan
- Danny Klassen
- Eric Knott
- Matt Koch
- Mike Koplove
- Bobby Korecky
- Joey Krehbiel
- Josh Kroeger
- Zach Kroenke
- Jason Kubel

== L ==
- Gerald Laird
- Jake Lamb
- Matt Langwell
- Adam LaRoche
- Jordan Lawlar
- Mike Leake
- Wil Ledezma
- Travis Lee
- Dominic Leone
- Artie Lewicki
- Kyle Lewis
- Domingo Leyba
- Kerry Ligtenberg
- Matt Lindstrom
- Zack Littell
- Mark Little
- Jonathan Loáisiga
- Tim Locastro
- Tyler Locklear
- Adam Loewen
- Evan Longoria
- Albie Lopez
- Felipe López
- Javier López
- Rodrigo López
- Yoan López
- Jordan Luplow
- Brandon Lyon

== M ==
- Matt Mantei
- Joe Mantiply
- Barry Manuel
- Jason Marquis
- Deven Marrero
- Evan Marshall
- Alfredo Marte
- Andy Marte
- Ketel Marte
- Starling Marte
- Corbin Martin
- J.D. Martinez
- Joe Martinez
- Justin Martinez
- Jeff Mathis
- Wyatt Mathisen
- Brent Mayne
- James McCann
- Brandon McCarthy
- Jake McCarthy
- Quinton McCracken
- John McDonald
- TJ McFarland
- Scott McGough
- Brandon Medders
- Kris Medlen
- Humberto Mejía
- Mark Melancon
- Keury Mella
- Cristian Mena
- Hensley Meulens
- Chris Michalak
- Kam Mickolio
- Keynan Middleton
- Matt Mieske
- Wade Miley
- Damian Miller
- Shelby Miller
- Juan Miranda
- Anthony Misiewicz
- Chad Moeller
- Mike Mohler
- Raúl Mondesí
- Miguel Montero
- Christian Montes De Oca
- Jordan Montgomery
- Melvin Mora
- Gabriel Moreno
- Mike Morgan
- Juan Morillo
- Reyes Moronta
- Terry Mulholland
- Kevin Mulvey
- Bill Murphy
- John Ryan Murphy
- Mike Myers

== N ==
- Xavier Nady
- Shane Nance
- Josh Naylor
- Kristopher Negrón
- Kyle Nelson
- Ryne Nelson
- Kevin Newman
- Wil Nieves
- Dustin Nippert
- Lars Nootbaar
- Jordan Norberto
- Vladimir Nuñez
- Vidal Nuño

== O ==
- Peter O'Brien
- Trent Oeltjen
- Augie Ojeda
- Gregg Olson
- Tim Olson
- Eddie Oropesa
- Russ Ortiz
- Lyle Overbay
- Chris Owings
- Micah Owings

== P ==
- Jordan Pacheco
- Vicente Padilla
- Jarrod Parker
- Gerardo Parra
- Jose Parra
- Joe Paterson
- John Patterson
- Xavier Paul
- Joel Payamps
- Matt Peacock
- Joc Pederson
- Jace Peterson
- Jailen Peguero
- Tony Peña
- Wily Mo Peña
- Cliff Pennington
- David Peralta
- Geraldo Perdomo
- Óliver Pérez
- Jace Peterson
- Yusmeiro Petit
- Brandon Pfaadt
- Tommy Pham
- Ricky Pickett
- Dan Plesac
- A. J. Pollock
- Austin Pope
- Sean Poppen
- Dante Powell
- Martín Prado
- Bret Prinz
- A. J. Puk
- J.J. Putz

== Q ==
- Chad Qualls
- Carlos Quentin

== R ==
- Brady Raggio
- J. C. Ramirez
- Noé Ramirez
- Henry Ramos
- Stephen Randolph
- Cody Ransom
- Taylor Rashi
- Jon Rauch
- Robbie Ray
- Addison Reed
- Josh Reddick
- Nolan Reimold
- Jack Reinheimer
- Dennys Reyes
- Mark Reynolds
- Matt Reynolds
- Shane Reynolds
- Armando Reynoso
- Trevor Richards
- Emmanuel Rivera
- Saul Rivera
- Ryan Roberts
- Connor Robertson
- Mike Robertson
- Fernando Rodney
- Eduardo Rodríguez
- Félix Rodríguez
- Rafael Rodríguez
- Chaz Roe
- Josh Rojas
- Jamie Romak
- Alex Romero
- Hector Rondon
- Carlos Rosa
- Adam Rosales
- Leo Rosales
- Cody Ross
- Ryan Rowland-Smith
- Johnny Ruffin
- Rusty Ryal
- Rob Ryan

== S ==
- Andrew Saalfrank
- Erik Sabel
- Donnie Sadler
- Takashi Saito
- Carlos Santana
- Dennis Santana
- Fernando Salas
- Jeff Salazar
- Jarrod Saltalamacchia
- Duaner Sánchez
- Reggie Sanders
- Joe Saunders
- Max Scherzer
- Curt Schilling
- Daniel Schlereth
- Konrad Schmidt
- Scott Schoeneweis
- A.J. Schugel
- Bo Schultz
- Mike Schultz
- Robby Scott
- Tayler Scott
- Jean Segura
- Scott Service
- Richie Sexson
- Paul Sewald
- Bryan Shaw
- Jimmie Sherfy
- Braden Shipley
- Tony Sipp
- Brandyn Sittinger
- Tyler Skaggs
- Doug Slaten
- Aaron Small
- Caleb Smith
- Jason Smith
- Pavin Smith
- Riley Smith
- Chris Snyder
- Clint Sodowsky
- Peter Solomon
- Joakim Soria
- Michael Soroka
- Juan Sosa
- Steven Souza Jr.
- Steve Sparks
- Junior Spivey
- Russ Springer
- Zeke Spruill
- Daniel Stange
- Andy Stankiewicz
- Chris Stewart
- Kelly Stinnett
- Matt Stites
- Todd Stottlemyre
- Kade Strowd
- Peter Strzelecki
- Eugenio Suárez
- Cole Sulser
- Jeff Suppan
- Anthony Swarzak
- Blake Swihart
- Greg Swindell

== T ==
- Tim Tawa
- Amaury Telemaco
- Luis Terrero
- Joe Thatcher
- Alek Thomas
- Ryan Thompson
- Yasmany Tomás
- Chad Tracy
- Tommy Troy
- Mark Trumbo

== U ==
- Edwin Uceta
- Justin Upton

== V ==
- César Valdez
- Efrain Valdez
- José Valverde
- Josh VanMeter
- Carlos Vargas
- Claudio Vargas
- Ildemaro Vargas
- Daulton Varsho
- Esmerling Vásquez
- Javier Vázquez
- Thyago Vieira
- Brandon Villafuerte
- Óscar Villarreal
- Luis Vizcaíno
- Stephen Vogt
- Ed Vosberg

== W ==
- Tyler Wagner
- Ryan Waldschmidt
- Christian Walker
- Taijuan Walker
- Blake Walston
- Turner Ward
- Luke Weaver
- Brandon Webb
- Neil Weber
- Allen Webster
- Rickie Weeks
- Jordan Weems
- J. B. Wendelken
- Ryan Wheeler
- Devon White
- Josh Whitesell
- Bob Wickman
- Taylor Widener
- Tom Wilhelmsen
- Matt Williams
- Dontrelle Willis
- Bobby Wilson
- Josh Wilson
- Bobby Witt
- Bob Wolcott
- Tony Womack
- Jake Woodford
- Tim Worrell

== Y ==
- Alex Young
- Andrew Young
- Chris Young
- Ernie Young

== Z ==
- Mike Zagurski
- Clay Zavada
- Seby Zavala
- Brad Ziegler
- Alan Zinter
