= 1998 New York Mets season =

1998 New York Mets
- League: National League
- Division: East
- Ballpark: Shea Stadium
- City: New York
- Record: 88–74 (.543)
- Divisional place: 2nd
- Owners: Nelson Doubleday Jr., Fred Wilpon
- General manager: Steve Phillips
- Manager: Bobby Valentine
- Television: WWOR-TV/Fox Sports New York (Ralph Kiner, Tim McCarver, Fran Healy, Howie Rose, Gary Thorne)
- Radio: WFAN (Bob Murphy, Gary Cohen, Ed Coleman); WADO (spanish) (Juan Alicea, Billy Berroa)

The 1998 New York Mets season was the 37th regular season for the Mets. Like the previous season, they finished the season with a record of 88–74. Despite placing second in the National League East, the Mets fell one game short of playoff contention following a catastrophic collapse during the final week of the season, losing their final five games of the season. They were managed by Bobby Valentine. They played home games at Shea Stadium.

Despite the collapse, the season is most remembered for the trade acquisition of All-Star and future Hall of Fame catcher Mike Piazza in May from the Florida Marlins (Piazza had been just traded from the Los Angeles Dodgers to the Marlins a week earlier before his Mets trade). Upon the trade to New York, Piazza instantly became the team's best player and face of the franchise.

== Offseason ==
- November 24, 1997: John Olerud was signed as a free agent with the New York Mets.
- December 18, 1997: Dennis Cook was acquired from the Florida Marlins in exchange for Fletcher Bates and Scott Comer.
- February 6, 1998: Al Leiter and Ralph Milliard were acquired from the Florida Marlins in exchange for A. J. Burnett, Jesus Sanchez, and Robert Stratton.

== Regular season ==
Despite their collapse toward the end of the season, the 1998 season was notable for the Mets due in large part to the acquisition of All-Star catcher Mike Piazza. The Mets were in need of a catcher due to an injury suffered by their own star catcher Todd Hundley, and took advantage of both Piazza's disagreement over a new contract with the Los Angeles Dodgers and the ongoing salary dumping by the defending World Series champion Florida Marlins; unable to negotiate a deal, the Dodgers traded Piazza to the Marlins, who turned around several days later and dealt Piazza to the Mets for outfield prospect Preston Wilson, among others. Piazza contributed a .348 average with 23 home runs and 76 RBI during his time with the Mets and once again was voted to the National League All-Star team. Hundley, meanwhile, attempted to make a move to left field when he rejoined the team, but it did not work. His tenure with the Mets ended when he was traded to the Dodgers after the season.

John Olerud was again the hitting star for the Mets. He recorded a .354 average, the second best in all of baseball behind Larry Walker, and once again led the team with 93 RBI, to go with his 22 home runs. On the pitching side, another Marlins castoff made his presence felt as Al Leiter had his career best marks as a starter. Leiter won a career high seventeen games and added a 2.47 ERA. Rick Reed continued his career renaissance by adding sixteen wins of his own.

=== Opening Day starters ===
- Edgardo Alfonzo
- Carlos Baerga
- Bernard Gilkey
- Butch Huskey
- Bobby Jones
- Brian McRae
- John Olerud
- Rey Ordóñez
- Tim Spehr

The Mets played an unforgettable opening day game at Shea Stadium on March 31 against their division rival Philadelphia Phillies. Both of them were involved in the longest scoreless opening day game in the National League and the longest one in MLB since 1926 when the Washington Senators beat the Philadelphia Athletics 1–0 in 15 innings. The Mets won the game 1–0 in 14 innings when backup catcher Alberto Castillo delivered a full-count, two-out, pinch-hit single to right with the bases loaded off Philadelphia closer Ricky Bottalico. This was the first regular season baseball game played in New York in March.

=== Notable transactions ===
- May 10, 1998: Steve Decker was signed as a free agent with the New York Mets.
- May 22, 1998: Mike Piazza was traded by the Florida Marlins to the New York Mets for Preston Wilson, Ed Yarnall, and Geoff Goetz (minors).
- June 16, 1998: Rich Becker was selected off waivers by the Baltimore Orioles from the New York Mets.
- July 3, 1998: Josías Manzanillo was signed as a free agent with the New York Mets.
- July 31, 1998: Tony Phillips was traded by the Toronto Blue Jays to the New York Mets for Leo Estrella.
- July 31, 1998: Bill Pulsipher was traded by the New York Mets to the Milwaukee Brewers for Mike Kinkade.

=== Season standings ===
NL East
Team	W	L	Pct.	GB	Home	Road
Atlanta Braves	106	56	.654	—	56‍–‍25	50‍–‍31
New York Mets	88	74	.543	18	47‍–‍34	41‍–‍40
Philadelphia Phillies	75	87	.463	31	40‍–‍41	35‍–‍46
Montreal Expos	65	97	.401	41	39‍–‍42	26‍–‍55
Florida Marlins	54	108	.333	52	31‍–‍50	23‍–‍58

=== Record vs. opponents ===
1998 National League record Source: MLB Standings Grid – 1998
Team	AZ	ATL	CHC	CIN	COL	FLA	HOU	LAD	MIL	MON	NYM	PHI	PIT	SD	SF	STL	AL
Arizona	—	1–8	5–7	4–5	6–6	6–2	4–5	4–8	6–3	2–7	4–5	2–7	6–3	3–9	5–7	2–7	5–8
Atlanta	8–1	—	3–6	7–2	5–3	7–5	4–5	8–1	7–2	6–6	9–3	8–4	7–2	5–4	7–2	6–3	9–7
Chicago	7–5	6–3	—	6–5	7–2	7–2	4–7	4–5	6–6	7–2	4–5	3–6	8–3	5–4	7–3	4–7	5–8
Cincinnati	5–4	2–7	5–6	—	4–5	9–0	3–8	5–4	6–5	8–1	3–6	4–5	5–7	1–11	2–7	8–3	7-6
Colorado	6–6	3–5	2–7	5–4	—	6–3	6–5	6–6	4–7	7–2	3–6	5–4	5–4	5–7	7–5	3–6	4–8
Florida	2–6	5–7	2–7	0–9	3–6	—	3–6	4–5	0–9	5–7	5–7	6–6	3–6	4–5	0–9	4–5	8–8
Houston	5–4	5–4	7–4	8–3	5–6	6–3	—	3–6	9–2	7–2	5–4	7–2	9–2	5–4	6–3	5–7	10–4
Los Angeles	8–4	1–8	5–4	4–5	6–6	5–4	6–3	—	5–4	5–4	3–5	5–4	7–5	5–7	6–6	4–5	8–5
Milwaukee	3–6	2–7	6–6	5–6	7–4	9–0	2–9	4–5	—	6–3	1–8	4–5	6–5	3–6	5–4	3–8	8–6
Montreal	7–2	6–6	2–7	1–8	2–7	7–5	2–7	4–5	3–6	—	8–4	5–7	2–7	4–4	3–6	3–6	6–10
New York	5–4	3–9	5–4	6–3	6–3	7–5	4–5	5–3	8–1	4–8	—	8–4	4–5	4–5	4–5	6–3	9–7
Philadelphia	7-2	4–8	6–3	5–4	4–5	6–6	2–7	4–5	5–4	7–5	4–8	—	8–1	1–8	2–6	3–6	7–9
Pittsburgh	3–6	2–7	3–8	7–5	4–5	6–3	2–9	5–7	5–6	7–2	5–4	1–8	—	5–4	2–7	6–5	6–7
San Diego	9–3	4–5	4–5	11–1	7–5	5–4	4–5	7–5	6–3	4–4	5–4	8–1	4–5	—	8–4	6–3	6–7
San Francisco	7–5	2–7	3–7	7–2	5–7	9–0	3–6	6–6	4–5	6–3	5–4	6–2	7–2	4–8	—	7–5	8–5
St. Louis	7–2	3–6	7–4	3–8	6–3	5-4	7–5	5–4	8–3	6–3	3–6	6–3	5–6	3–6	5–7	—	4–9

=== Game log ===
Legend
Mets Win	Mets Loss	Game Postponed	Eliminated from playoff spot
Bold = Mets team member

1998 Game Log
Overall: 88–74 (Home: 47–34; Away: 41–40)
March/April: (13–12) Home: 8–7; Away: 5–5

#	Date	Opponent	Score	Win	Loss	Save	Location	Attendance	Record
1	March 31	Phillies	1–0 (14)	**Wendell** (1–0)	Bottalico (0–1)	—	**Shea Stadium**	49,142	1–0
2	April 2	Phillies	5–6	Portugal (1–0)	**Leiter** (0–1)	Bottalico (1)	**Shea Stadium**	13,591	1–1
3	April 3	Pirates	2–1	**McMichael** (1–0)	Peters (0–1)	—	**Shea Stadium**	15,245	2–1
4	April 4	Pirates	7–6 (13)	**Wendell** (2–0)	Peters (0–2)	—	**Shea Stadium**	17,633	3–1
5	April 5	Pirates	7–0	**Yoshii** (1–0)	Silva (0–1)	—	**Shea Stadium**	18,205	4–1
6	April 6	Pirates	2–4	Cordova (2–0)	**B. Jones** (0–1)	Loiselle (2)	**Shea Stadium**	13,528	4–2
7	April 7	@ Cubs	3–2	**Leiter** (1–1)	Gonzalez (0–1)	**Franco** (1)	Wrigley Field	16,293	5–2
–	April 8	@ Cubs	Postponed (rain); rescheduled for July 24						
8	April 9	@ Cubs	7–8	Trachsel (2–0)	**Reed** (0–1)	Beck (5)	Wrigley Field	17,313	5–3
9	April 10	@ Brewers	3–5	Juden (2–0)	**Mlicki** (0–1)	D. Jones (4)	County Stadium	10,330	5–4
10	April 11	@ Brewers	2–1	**Cook** (1–0)	Wickman (0–3)	**Franco** (2)	County Stadium	24,140	6–4
11	April 12	@ Brewers	6–4	**Wendell** (3–0)	P. Wagner (0–1)	**Rojas** (1)	County Stadium	10,459	7–4
–	April 13	@ Brewers	Postponed (rain); rescheduled for July 22						
12	April 14	Cubs	6–0	**Leiter** (2–1)	Gonzalez (0–2)	—	**Shea Stadium**	15,965	8–4
13	April 15	Cubs	2–1	**Reed** (1–1)	Trachsel (2–1)	**Franco** (3)	**Shea Stadium**	16,012	9–4
14	April 16	Cubs	4–8	Tapani (3–1)	**Mlicki** (0–2)	—	**Shea Stadium**	50,814	9–5
15	April 17	@ Reds	3–4	Remlinger (2–2)	**B. Jones** (0–2)	Shaw (5)	Cinergy Field	21,384	9–6
16	April 18	@ Reds	5–4 (10)	**Rojas** (1–0)	Belinda (0–2)	**Franco** (4)	Cinergy Field	21,213	10–6
17	April 19	@ Reds	14–0	**Leiter** (3–1)	White (0–2)	—	Cinergy Field	16,743	11–6
18	April 21	Astros	0–6	Hampton (4–0)	**Reed** (1–2)	—	**Shea Stadium**	14,774	11–7
19	April 22	Astros	10–7	**Cook** (2–0)	Henry (1–1)	—	**Shea Stadium**	12,772	12–7
–	April 23	Astros	Postponed (rain); rescheduled for April 27						
20	April 24	Reds	3–2	**B. Jones** (1–2)	Shaw (0–2)	**Franco** (5)	**Shea Stadium**	15,546	13–7
21	April 25	Reds	0–2	Weathers (2–1)	**Yoshii** (1–1)	Shaw (7)	**Shea Stadium**	22,652	13–8
–	April 26	Reds	Postponed (rain); rescheduled for May 19						
22	April 27	Astros	3–4	Nitkowski (1–1)	**Franco** (0–1)	B. Wagner (6)	**Shea Stadium**	17,656	13–9
23	April 28	@ Astros	3–4 (10)	Magnante (2–1)	**Hudek** (0–1)	—	Astrodome	14,943	13–10
24	April 29	@ Astros	1–6	Lima (4–1)	**Mlicki** (0–3)	—	Astrodome	14,448	13–11
25	April 30	Rockies	0–4	Kile (3–3)	**B. Jones** (1–3)	—	**Shea Stadium**	12,599	13–12

May: (18–8) Home: 11–3; Away: 7–5

#	Date	Opponent	Score	Win	Loss	Save	Location	Attendance	Record
–	May 1	Rockies	Postponed (rain); rescheduled for August 18						
26	May 2	Rockies	3–7	Leskanic (2–3)	**Cook** (2–1)	—	**Shea Stadium**	19,968	13–13
27	May 3	Rockies	5–2	**Reed** (2–2)	Astacio (2–4)	—	**Shea Stadium**	19,493	14–13
28	May 4	Diamondbacks	2–4 (11)	Olson (1–1)	**Bohanon** (0–1)	—	**Shea Stadium**	18,980	14–14
29	May 5	Diamondbacks	9–1	**Mlicki** (1–3)	Daal (0–2)	—	**Shea Stadium**	13,205	15–14
30	May 6	Diamondbacks	8–2	**Rojas** (2–0)	Sodowsky (1–2)	—	**Shea Stadium**	17,681	16–14
31	May 7	Cardinals	4–1	**Yoshii** (2–1)	Osborne (1–2)	**Franco** (6)	**Shea Stadium**	14,715	17–14
32	May 8	Cardinals	9–2	**Reed** (3–2)	Politte (2–2)	—	**Shea Stadium**	16,132	18–14
–	May 9	Cardinals	Postponed (rain); rescheduled for August 20						
–	May 10	Cardinals	Postponed (rain); rescheduled for August 21						
33	May 11	@ Padres	1–2	Brown (3–2)	**Leiter** (3–2)	Hoffman (10)	Qualcomm Stadium	15,291	18–15
–	May 12	@ Padres	Postponed (rain); rescheduled for May 14						
34	May 13	@ Padres	4–3	**Jones** (2–3)	Hamilton (3–3)	**Franco** (7)	Qualcomm Stadium	14,929	19–15
35	May 14 (1)	@ Padres	1–3	Boehringer (4–1)	**Cook** (2–2)	Hoffman (11)	Qualcomm Stadium	N/A	19–16
36	May 14 (2)	@ Padres	2–6	Miceli (3–1)	**McMichael** (1–1)	—	Qualcomm Stadium	26,488	19–17
37	May 15	@ Giants	2–3	Hershiser (2–3)	**McMichael** (1–2)	Nen (8)	3Com Park	14,678	19–18
38	May 16	@ Giants	4–1	**Reed** (4–2)	Rueter (4–3)	**Franco** (8)	3Com Park	30,131	20–18
39	May 17	@ Giants	2–4	Gardner (3–2)	**Leiter** (3–3)	Nen (9)	3Com Park	24,408	20–19
40	May 19 (1)	Reds	7–3	**Jones** (3–3)	Tomko (5–2)	—	**Shea Stadium**	N/A	21–19
41	May 19 (2)	Reds	5–3	**Bohanon** (1–1)	Winchester (2–2)	**Franco** (9)	**Shea Stadium**	15,558	22–19
42	May 20	Reds	6–8	Harnisch (4–0)	**Hudek** (0–2)	Shaw (14)	**Shea Stadium**	12,834	22–20
43	May 21	Reds	6–1	**Yoshii** (3–1)	Hutton (0–1)	—	**Shea Stadium**	13,766	23–20
44	May 22	Brewers	3–2	**Reed** (5–2)	Woodall (0–2)	**Franco** (10)	**Shea Stadium**	22,307	24–20
45	May 23	Brewers	3–0	**Leiter** (4–3)	Juden (5–3)	—	**Shea Stadium**	32,908	25–20
46	May 24	Brewers	8–3	**Jones** (4–3)	Eldred (0–4)	—	**Shea Stadium**	47,291	26–20
47	May 26	@ Marlins	10–6	**Bohanon** (2–1)	Larkin (2–5)	—	Pro Player Stadium	14,760	27–20
48	May 27	@ Marlins	8–2	**Yoshii** (4–1)	Meadows (4–5)	—	Pro Player Stadium	15,854	28–20
49	May 29	@ Phillies	11–0	**Reed** (6–2)	Beech (1–3)	—	Veterans Stadium	21,567	29–20
50	May 30	@ Phillies	6–4	**Leiter** (5–3)	Green (3–4)	**Franco** (11)	Veterans Stadium	30,660	30–20
51	May 31	@ Phillies	8–6	**Rojas** (3–0)	Winston (2–1)	**Franco** (12)	Veterans Stadium	23,025	31–20

June: (12–15) Home: 6–5; Away: 6–10

#	Date	Opponent	Score	Win	Loss	Save	Location	Attendance	Record
52	June 1	@ Pirates	3–4	Schmidt (8–1)	**Mlicki** (1–4)	Rincon (4)	Three Rivers Stadium	11,274	31–21
53	June 2	@ Pirates	2–5	Peters (1–3)	**Bohanon** (2–2)	Rincon (5)	Three Rivers Stadium	9,040	31–22
54	June 3	@ Pirates	0–3	Lieber (3–7)	**Reed** (6–3)	Christiansen (1)	Three Rivers Stadium	17,691	31–23
55	June 5	@ Red Sox	9–2	**Leiter** (6–3)	Martinez (6–2)	—	Fenway Park	32,214	32–23
56	June 6	@ Red Sox	1–0	**Jones** (5–3)	Wakefield (6–3)	**Franco** (13)	Fenway Park	32,545	33–23
57	June 7	@ Red Sox	0–5	Avery (3–1)	**Yoshii** (4–2)	—	Fenway Park	30,630	33–24
58	June 8	Devil Rays	3–0	**Reed** (7–3)	Springer (2–10)	—	**Shea Stadium**	24,186	34–24
59	June 9	Devil Rays	4–5 (11)	Mecir (2–0)	**Hudek** (0–3)	R. Hernandez (12)	**Shea Stadium**	30,336	34–25
60	June 10	Devil Rays	3–2	**Leiter** (7–3)	White (0–3)	**Rojas** (2)	**Shea Stadium**	21,682	35–25
61	June 11	@ Marlins	5–3	**Jones** (6–3)	Sanchez (3–3)	**Franco** (14)	Pro Player Stadium	14,003	36–25
62	June 12	@ Marlins	3–4	Mantei (1–0)	**Bohanon** (2–3)	—	Pro Player Stadium	35,652	36–26
63	June 13	@ Marlins	7–4	**Reed** (8–3)	Meadows (4–6)	**Franco** (15)	Pro Player Stadium	31,887	37–26
64	June 14	@ Marlins	4–5	Mantei (2–0)	**Hudek** (0–4)	—	Pro Player Stadium	23,924	37–27
65	June 16	@ Expos	2–0	**Leiter** (8–3)	Hermanson (4–6)	—	Olympic Stadium	12,662	38–27
66	June 17	@ Expos	4–5	Urbina (4–2)	**Rojas** (3–1)	—	Olympic Stadium	7,606	38–28
67	June 18	@ Expos	6–7	Bennett (2–3)	**Yoshii** (4–3)	Urbina (17)	Olympic Stadium	8,788	38–29
68	June 19	Marlins	2–3	Meadows (5–6)	**Reed** (8–4)	Mantei (1)	**Shea Stadium**	32,738	38–30
69	June 20	Marlins	3–8	L. Hernandez (5–4)	**Nomo** (2–8)	—	**Shea Stadium**	44,355	38–31
70	June 21	Marlins	3–2	**Leiter** (9–3)	Fontenot (0–5)	**Franco** (16)	**Shea Stadium**	30,673	39–31
71	June 22	@ Orioles	2–7	Mussina (6–4)	**Jones** (6–4)	—	Oriole Park at Camden Yards	45,535	39–32
72	June 23	@ Orioles	6–3	**Hudek** (1–4)	Rhodes (3–3)	**Franco** (17)	Oriole Park at Camden Yards	46,385	40–32
73	June 24	Orioles	6–3	**Reed** (9–4)	Smith (3–4)	**Franco** (18)	**Shea Stadium**	29,789	41–32
74	June 25	Orioles	3–2	**Cook** (3–2)	Benitez (2–2)	—	**Shea Stadium**	35,156	42–32
75	June 26	Yankees	4–8	Mendoza (5–1)	**Leiter** (9–4)	Rivera (19)	**Shea Stadium**	53,404	42–33
76	June 27	Yankees	2–7	Pettitte (9–5)	**Jones** (6–5)	—	**Shea Stadium**	53,587	42–34
77	June 28	Yankees	2–1	**Cook** (4–2)	Mendoza (5–2)	—	**Shea Stadium**	53,749	43–34
78	June 30	@ Blue Jays	3–6	Clemens (9–6)	**Reed** (9–5)	—	SkyDome	30,322	43–35

July: (13–15) Home: 7–9; Away: 6–6

#	Date	Opponent	Score	Win	Loss	Save	Location	Attendance	Record
79	July 1	@ Blue Jays	10–15	Plesac (3–2)	**Rojas** (3–2)	—	SkyDome	37,252	43–36
80	July 2	@ Blue Jays	9–1	**Jones** (7–5)	Hentgen (9–5)	—	SkyDome	27,325	44–36
81	July 3	@ Braves	2–3	Glavine (12–3)	**Bohanon** (2–4)	Ligtenberg (9)	Turner Field	48,757	44–37
82	July 4	@ Braves	1–4	Millwood (10–4)	**Yoshii** (4–4)	—	Turner Field	47,900	44–38
83	July 5	@ Braves	2–3 (11)	Seanez (1–0)	**Franco** (0–2)	—	Turner Field	40,430	44–39
**69th All-Star Game in Denver, Colorado**
84	July 9	Expos	8–9 (11)	Maddux (2–2)	**Franco** (0–3)	Urbina (21)	**Shea Stadium**	27,193	44–40
85	July 10	Expos	6–8	Bennett (3–3)	**Franco** (0–4)	Urbina (22)	**Shea Stadium**	36,538	44–41
86	July 11	Expos	8–4	**Reed** (10–5)	Pavano (2–3)	—	**Shea Stadium**	48,006	45–41
87	July 12	Expos	5–2	**Tam** (1–0)	Vazquez (3–7)	**Cook** (1)	**Shea Stadium**	51,568	46–41
88	July 14	Braves	2–4	Smoltz (7–2)	**Jones** (7–6)	Ligtenberg (11)	**Shea Stadium**	38,000	46–42
89	July 15	Braves	1–12	Neagle (10–7)	**Yoshii** (4–5)	—	**Shea Stadium**	41,347	46–43
90	July 16	Phillies	2–4	Portugal (5–2)	**Reed** (10–6)	M. Leiter (20)	**Shea Stadium**	20,283	46–44
91	July 17	Phillies	6–0	**Nomo** (3–8)	Loewer (4–2)	—	**Shea Stadium**	23,298	47–44
92	July 18	Phillies	7–0	**A. Leiter** (10–4)	Green (6–6)	—	**Shea Stadium**	37,208	48–44
93	July 19	Phillies	6–7 (10)	M. Leiter (3–7)	**Cook** (4–3)	—	**Shea Stadium**	29,520	48–45
94	July 20	Pirates	1–3	Cordova (8–8)	**Yoshii** (4–6)	Rincon (11)	**Shea Stadium**	18,088	48–46
95	July 21	Pirates	4–0	**Reed** (11–6)	Schmidt (8–7)	—	**Shea Stadium**	22,844	49–46
96	July 22 (1)	@ Brewers	7–5	**Cook** (5–3)	Wickman (3–6)	**Franco** (19)	County Stadium	N/A	50–46
97	July 22 (2)	@ Brewers	6–1	**Nomo** (4–8)	Patrick (4–1)	—	County Stadium	23,920	51–46
98	July 23	@ Brewers	6–5	**McMichael** (2–3)	Myers (2–2)	**Franco** (20)	County Stadium	27,046	52–46
99	July 24 (1)	@ Cubs	5–0	**Reynoso** (1–0)	Gonzalez (7–7)	—	Wrigley Field	N/A	53–46
100	July 24 (2)	@ Cubs	7–3	**Cook** (6–3)	Adams (7–6)	—	Wrigley Field	40,684	54–46
101	July 25	@ Cubs	2–3	Tapani (12–6)	**Franco** (0–5)	Beck (30)	Wrigley Field	40,436	54–47
102	July 26	@ Cubs	1–3	Wood (10–5)	**Reed** (11–7)	Beck (31)	Wrigley Field	40,329	54–48
103	July 28	Padres	7–3	**Nomo** (5–8)	Ashby (14–6)	**McMichael** (2)	**Shea Stadium**	21,005	55–48
104	July 29	Padres	7–6	**Rojas** (4–2)	Wall (4–3)	**Franco** (21)	**Shea Stadium**	23,694	56–48
105	July 30	Padres	1–3 (10)	Miceli (8–4)	**Cook** (6–4)	Hoffman (34)	**Shea Stadium**	22,882	56–49
106	July 31	Dodgers	3–4	Osuna (6–0)	**Franco** (0–6)	Shaw (32)	**Shea Stadium**	49,407	56–50

August: (20–12) Home: 10–6; Away: 10–6

#	Date	Opponent	Score	Win	Loss	Save	Location	Attendance	Record
107	August 1	Dodgers	2–1	**Reed** (12–7)	Shaw (2–5)	—	**Shea Stadium**	42,224	57–50
108	August 2	Dodgers	9–3	**Reynoso** (2–0)	Bohanon (4–7)	—	**Shea Stadium**	33,843	58–50
109	August 3	Dodgers	5–8	Mlicki (6–5)	**McMichael** (2–4)	Shaw (33)	**Shea Stadium**	24,416	58–51
110	August 4	Giants	7–6 (10)	**Cook** (7–4)	Mesa (5–5)	—	**Shea Stadium**	32,943	59–51
111	August 5	Giants	4–6	Ortiz (1–1)	**B. J. Jones** (7–7)	Nen (29)	**Shea Stadium**	35,571	59–52
112	August 6	Giants	9–8	**Wendell** (4–0)	Nen (7–3)	—	**Shea Stadium**	36,920	60–52
113	August 7	@ Rockies	8–7	**Reed** (13–7)	Astacio (10–11)	**Franco** (22)	Coors Field	48,365	61–52
114	August 8	@ Rockies	4–3	**Reynoso** (3–0)	B. M. Jones (5–5)	**Franco** (23)	Coors Field	48,312	62–52
115	August 9	@ Rockies	4–11	Kile (8–14)	**Nomo** (5–9)	—	Coors Field	48,014	62–53
116	August 10	@ Cardinals	4–2	**Leiter** (11–4)	Morris (3–2)	**Franco** (24)	Busch Stadium	41,252	63–53
117	August 11	@ Cardinals	8–3	**B. J. Jones** (8–7)	Mercker (8–9)	—	Busch Stadium	34,489	64–53
118	August 12	@ Cardinals	4–5 (14)	Frascatore (2–3)	**Franco** (0–7)	—	Busch Stadium	34,260	64–54
119	August 14	@ Diamondbacks	3–2	**Reed** (14–7)	Telemaco (4–7)	**Wendell** (1)	Bank One Ballpark	47,562	65–54
120	August 15	@ Diamondbacks	5–4	**Reynoso** (4–0)	Chouinard (0–2)	**Franco** (25)	Bank One Ballpark	48,307	66–54
121	August 16	@ Diamondbacks	1–6	Daal (6–7)	**Nomo** (5–10)	—	Bank One Ballpark	44,537	66–55
122	August 18 (1)	Rockies	6–2	**Leiter** (12–4)	Astacio (11–12)	—	**Shea Stadium**	N/A	67–55
123	August 18 (2)	Rockies	6–3	**Rojas** (5–2)	McElroy (4–3)	**Franco** (26)	**Shea Stadium**	21,611	68–55
124	August 19	Rockies	2–1	**Yoshii** (5–6)	B. M. Jones (5–7)	**Franco** (27)	**Shea Stadium**	19,395	69–55
125	August 20 (1)	Cardinals	0–2	Osborne (3–2)	**Blair** (4–16)	Acevedo (3)	**Shea Stadium**	N/A	69–56
126	August 20 (2)	Cardinals	5–4	**Reed** (15–7)	Oliver (7–9)	**Wendell** (2)	**Shea Stadium**	45,308	70–56
127	August 21 (1)	Cardinals	5–10	Morris (4–3)	**Nomo** (5–11)	—	**Shea Stadium**	N/A	70–57
128	August 21 (2)	Cardinals	1–0	**Reynoso** (5–0)	Aybar (3–6)	**Franco** (28)	**Shea Stadium**	52,320	71–57
129	August 22	Diamondbacks	9–4	**B. J. Jones** (9–7)	Benes (11–12)	—	**Shea Stadium**	42,654	72–57
130	August 23	Diamondbacks	3–4	Anderson (9–12)	**Leiter** (12–5)	Olson (22)	**Shea Stadium**	36,039	72–58
131	August 24	Diamondbacks	5–9	Telemaco (5–8)	**Yoshii** (5–7)	Banks (1)	**Shea Stadium**	29,850	72–59
132	August 25	@ Giants	3–7	Ortiz (2–3)	**Reed** (15–8)	—	3Com Park	20,916	72–60
133	August 26	@ Giants	4–1	**Nomo** (6–11)	Hershiser (9–9)	—	3Com Park	18,227	73–60
134	August 27	@ Giants	3–11	Darwin (8–10)	**Reynoso** (5–1)	—	3Com Park	17,823	73–61
135	August 28	@ Dodgers	5–4 (10)	**Cook** (8–4)	Shaw (3–7)	**Franco** (29)	Dodger Stadium	52,154	74–61
136	August 29	@ Dodgers	4–3	**Leiter** (13–5)	Shaw (3–8)	**Franco** (30)	Dodger Stadium	49,181	75–61
137	August 30	@ Dodgers	2–4	Mlicki (8–6)	**Yoshii** (5–8)	—	Dodger Stadium	44,746	75–62
138	August 31	@ Dodgers	8–3	**Reed** (16–8)	Park (11–8)	—	Dodger Stadium	37,806	76–62

September: (12–12) Home: 5–4; Away: 7–8

#	Date	Opponent	Score	Win	Loss	Save	Location	Attendance	Record
139	September 1	@ Padres	8–9	Myers (2–2)	**Wendell** (4–1)	Hoffman (45)	Qualcomm Stadium	18,489	76–63
140	September 2	@ Padres	4–1	**Reynoso** (6–1)	Ashby (16–7)	**Franco** (31)	Qualcomm Stadium	17,565	77–63
141	September 4	Braves	2–1	**Leiter** (14–5)	Glavine (18–6)	—	**Shea Stadium**	34,617	78–63
142	September 5	Braves	5–4	**Wendell** (5–1)	Seanez (4–1)	**Franco** (32)	**Shea Stadium**	43,573	79–63
143	September 6	Braves	0–4	Smoltz (14–3)	**Reed** (16–9)	—	**Shea Stadium**	40,311	79–64
144	September 7	Braves	8–7	**McMichael** (3–4)	Rocker (1–2)	**Franco** (33)	**Shea Stadium**	22,953	80–64
145	September 8	@ Phillies	4–16	Byrd (3–2)	**Nomo** (6–12)	—	Veterans Stadium	18,661	80–65
146	September 9	@ Phillies	6–2	**Reynoso** (7–1)	Schilling (14–13)	**Franco** (34)	Veterans Stadium	16,193	81–65
147	September 10	@ Phillies	7–5	**Leiter** (15–5)	Green (6–10)	**Franco** (35)	Veterans Stadium	16,715	82–65
148	September 11	@ Expos	1–5	Pavano (5–8)	**Jones** (9–8)	Urbina (30)	Olympic Stadium	10,584	82–66
149	September 12	@ Expos	3–5	M. Maddux (3–3)	**Reed** (16–10)	Urbina (31)	Olympic Stadium	22,047	82–67
150	September 13	@ Expos	1–0	**Blair** (5–16)	Telford (3–6)	**Franco** (36)	Olympic Stadium	15,152	83–67
151	September 14	@ Astros	7–4 (13)	**McMichael** (4–4)	Magnante (4–7)	**Franco** (37)	Astrodome	24,241	84–67
152	September 15 (1)	@ Astros	5–6 (12)	Powell (7–5)	**Tam** (1–1)	—	Astrodome	N/A	84–68
153	September 15 (2)	@ Astros	8–4	**Leiter** (16–5)	Powell (7–6)	**Wendell** (3)	Astrodome	40,835	85–68
154	September 16	@ Astros	4–3 (11)	**McMichael** (5–4)	Bergman (12–9)	**Wendell** (4)	Astrodome	24,269	86–68
155	September 18	Marlins	6–7	Edmondson (4–4)	**Franco** (0–8)	Mantei (9)	**Shea Stadium**	34,862	86–69
156	September 19	Marlins	4–3	**Yoshii** (6–8)	Sanchez (7–9)	**Franco** (38)	**Shea Stadium**	52,062	87–69
157	September 20	Marlins	5–0	**Leiter** (17–5)	Meadows (10–13)	—	**Shea Stadium**	52,767	88–69
158	September 22	Expos	3–5	Thurman (4–5)	**Reynoso** (7–2)	Urbina (33)	**Shea Stadium**	32,467	88–70
159	September 23	Expos	0–3	Pavano (6–8)	**Jones** (9–9)	Urbina (34)	**Shea Stadium**	29,728	88–71
160	September 25	@ Braves	5–6	Martínez (4–6)	**Reed** (16–11)	Rocker (2)	Turner Field	48,443	88–72
161	September 26	@ Braves	0–4	Neagle (16–11)	**Leiter** (17–6)	—	Turner Field	48,117	88–73
162	September 27	@ Braves	2–7	G. Maddux (18–9)	**Reynoso** (7–3)	—	Turner Field	48,685	88–74

== Roster ==
1998 New York Mets
Roster
Pitchers: 43 Rigo Beltrán; 46 Willie Blair; 46 Brian Bohanon; 49 Brad Clontz; 27 Dennis Cook; 31,45 John Franco; 43 John Hudek; 28 Bobby Jones; 22 Al Leiter; 36 Greg McMichael; 38 Dave Mlicki; 16 Hideo Nomo; 21 Bill Pulsipher; 35 Rick Reed; 40 Armando Reynoso; 51 Mel Rojas; 36,38 Jeff Tam; 99 Turk Wendell; 21,29 Masato Yoshii	Catchers: 30 Alberto Castillo; 12 Jorge Fábregas; 31 Mike Piazza; 7 Todd Pratt; 33 Tim Spehr; 39 Rick Wilkins; Infielders: 13 Edgardo Alfonzo; 8 Carlos Baerga; 15 Matt Franco; 12 Shawn Gilbert; 18 Todd Haney; 33 Mike Kinkade; 17 Luis López; 26 Ralph Milliard; 5 John Olerud; 10 Rey Ordóñez; 18 Craig Paquette; 19 Jim Tatum	Outfielders: 39 Benny Agbayani; 23 Jermaine Allensworth; 6 Rich Becker; 23 Bernard Gilkey; 19 Lenny Harris; 9 Todd Hundley; 42 Butch Huskey; 11 Wayne Kirby; 56 Brian McRae; 25 Jay Payton; 6 Tony Phillips; 11 Preston Wilson	Manager: 2 Bobby Valentine; Coaches: 34 Bob Apodaca (pitching); 20 Bruce Benedict (bench); 52 Randy Niemann (bullpen); 79 Koji Nagai (bullpen catcher); 53 Tom Robson (hitting); 4 Cookie Rojas (third base); 1 Mookie Wilson (first base)

== Player stats ==
=== Batting ===
==== Starters by position ====
Note: Pos = Position; G = Games played; AB = At bats; H = Hits; Avg. = Batting average; HR = Home runs; RBI = Runs batted in

Pos	Player	G	AB	H	Avg.	HR	RBI
C	Mike Piazza	109	394	137	.348	23	76
1B	John Olerud	160	557	197	.354	22	93
2B	Carlos Baerga	147	511	136	.266	7	53
SS	Rey Ordóñez	153	505	124	.246	1	42
3B	Edgardo Alfonso	144	557	155	.278	17	78
LF	Bernard Gilkey	82	264	60	.227	4	28
CF	Brian McRae	159	552	146	.264	21	79
RF	Butch Huskey	113	369	93	.252	13	59

==== Other batters ====
Note: G = Games played; AB = At bats; H = Hits; Avg. = Batting average; HR = Home runs; RBI = Runs batted in

Player	G	AB	H	Avg.	HR	RBI
Luis López	117	266	67	.252	2	22
Tony Phillips	52	188	42	.223	3	14
Lenny Harris	75	168	39	.232	6	17
Matt Franco	103	161	44	.273	1	13
Todd Hundley	53	124	20	.161	3	12
Rich Becker	49	100	19	.190	3	10
Alberto Castillo	38	83	17	.205	2	7
Todd Pratt	41	69	19	.275	2	18
Jermaine Allensworth	34	54	11	.204	2	4
Tim Spehr	21	51	7	.137	0	3
Jim Tatum	35	50	9	.180	2	13
Jorge Fábregas	20	32	6	.188	1	5
Wayne Kirby	26	31	6	.194	0	0
Jay Payton	15	22	7	.218	0	0
Preston Wilson	8	20	6	.300	0	2
Craig Paquette	7	19	5	.263	0	0
Rick Wilkins	5	15	2	.133	0	1
Benny Agbayani	11	15	2	.133	0	0
Todd Haney	3	3	0	.000	0	0
Shawn Gilbert	3	3	0	.000	0	0
Mike Kinkade	3	2	0	.000	0	0
Ralph Milliard	10	1	0	.000	0	0

=== Pitching ===
==== Starting pitchers ====
Note: G = Games pitched; IP = Innings pitched; W = Wins; L = Losses; ERA = Earned run average; SO = Strikeouts

Player	G	IP	W	L	ERA	SO
Rick Reed	31	212.1	16	11	3.48	153
Bobby Jones	30	195.1	9	9	4.05	115
Al Leiter	28	193.0	17	6	2.47	174
Masato Yoshii	29	171.2	6	8	3.93	117
Hideo Nomo	17	89.2	4	5	4.82	94
Armando Reynoso	11	68.1	7	3	3.82	40
Dave Mlicki	10	57.0	1	4	5.68	39

==== Other pitchers ====
Note: G = Games pitched; IP = Innings pitched; W = Wins; L = Losses; ERA = Earned run average; SO = Strikeouts

Player	G	IP	W	L	ERA	SO
Brian Bohanon	25	54.1	2	4	3.15	39
Willie Blair	11	28.2	1	1	3.14	21

==== Relief pitchers ====
Note: G = Games pitched; W = Wins; L = Losses; SV = Saves; ERA = Earned run average; SO = Strikeouts

Player	G	W	L	SV	ERA	SO
John Franco	61	0	8	38	3.62	59
Dennis Cook	73	8	4	1	2.38	79
Turk Wendell	66	5	1	4	2.93	58
Greg McMichael	52	5	3	1	4.02	44
Mel Rojas	50	5	2	2	6.05	41
John Hudek	28	1	4	0	4.00	28
Bill Pulsipher	15	0	0	0	6.91	13
Jeff Tam	15	1	1	0	6.23	8
Rigo Beltrán	7	0	0	0	3.38	5
Brad Clontz	2	0	0	0	9.00	2

== Awards and honors ==
All-Star Game

- Mike Piazza, Catcher, Starter
- Rick Reed, Pitcher, Reserve

== Farm system ==
Level	Team	League	Manager
AAA	Norfolk Tides	International League	Rick Dempsey
AA	Binghamton Mets	Eastern League	John Gibbons
A	St. Lucie Mets	Florida State League	Howie Freiling
A	Capital City Bombers	South Atlantic League	Doug Davis
A-Short Season	Pittsfield Mets	New York–Penn League	Roger LaFrançois
Rookie	Kingsport Mets	Appalachian League	Tim Foli
Rookie	GCL Mets	Gulf Coast League	John Stephenson

LEAGUE CHAMPIONS: St. Lucie, Capital City
