= Vic Darensbourg =

American baseball player (born 1970)

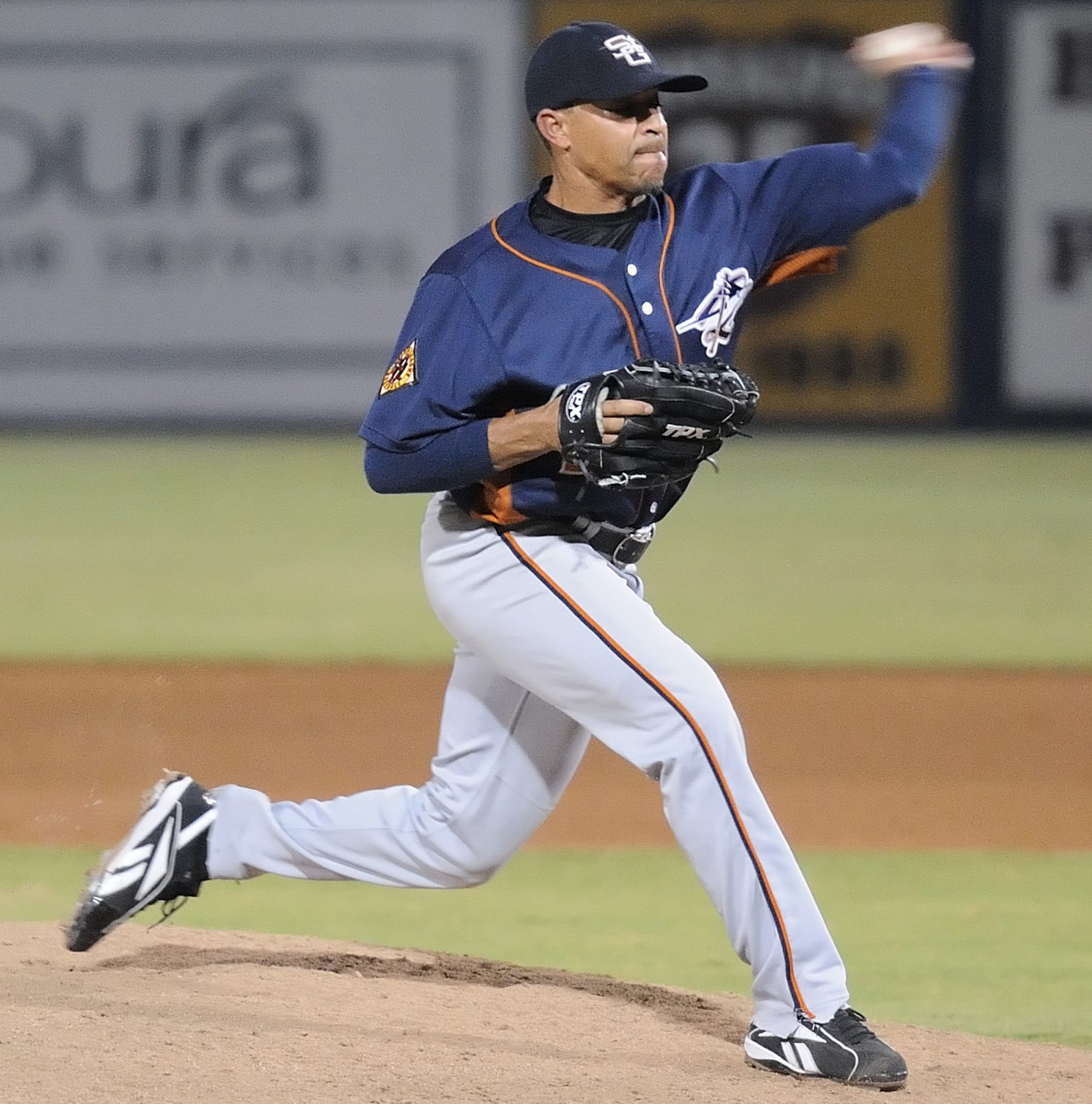
- Darensbourg pitching for the St. George Roadrunners in 2009
- Pitcher
- Born: November 13, 1970 (age 54); Los Angeles, California, U.S.
- Batted: Left Threw: Left

MLB debut
- April 1, 1998, for the Florida Marlins

Last MLB appearance
- September 28, 2005, for the Detroit Tigers

MLB statistics
- Win–loss record: 8–17
- Earned run average: 4.96
- Strikeouts: 229
- Stats at Baseball Reference

Teams
- Florida Marlins (1998–2002); Colorado Rockies (2003); Montreal Expos (2003); Chicago White Sox (2004); New York Mets (2004); Detroit Tigers (2005)

Victor Anthony Darensbourg (born November 13, 1970) is an American former professional baseball pitcher. He made his MLB debut with the Florida Marlins in 1998, and went on to play eight seasons in Major League Baseball (MLB).

== Major league career ==
Darensbourg has an 8–17 career record during eight seasons as a major league pitcher with the Florida Marlins, Colorado Rockies, Montreal Expos, Chicago White Sox, New York Mets, and Detroit Tigers.

On December 18, 2007, two years after his last MLB game, Darensbourg signed with the Philadelphia Phillies organization and played for their Triple-A affiliate, the Lehigh Valley IronPigs, before being released on May 2, 2008.

== Atlantic League ==
On June 11, 2008, Darensbourg signed with the Long Island Ducks of the Atlantic League. Victor has three daughters, Paige, Sydney, and Lauren, who live in Las Vegas, Nevada.
