= Koji Nagai (baseball) =

Japanese baseball coach (born 1971)

- Bullpen catcher
- Born: June 2, 1971 (age 54); Hiroshima, Japan

Teams
- As coach: New York Mets (1998–1999)

Koji Nagai (Japanese: 永井 浩二, Hepburn: Nagai Kōji; born June 2, 1971) is a Japanese professional baseball coach and former catcher, noted for coaching as a bullpen catcher for the New York Mets of Major League Baseball (MLB).

Nagai currently serves as head coach for the OISCA Hamatsu Kokusai High School (オイスカ浜松国際高等学校) student baseball team. (Note: In Japan, the term student baseball (学生野球, gakusei yakyū) is used in reference to college and high school baseball collectively.)

== Baseball career ==
=== Student baseball ===
Nagai began his career in the early 1990s as a catcher for Hiroshima Prefectural Hiroshima Commercial High School (広島県立広島商業高等学校), through which he was able to partake in the Kōshien baseball tournaments. Following high school, Nagai continued to play baseball at Asia University, a member of the Tohto University Baseball League.

=== NKK Baseball Club ===
By the late 1990s, Nagai moved on from student baseball and joined the NKK Baseball Club (NKK硬式野球部), an industrial team in the Japan Amateur Baseball Association (JABA). (Note: Teams in the Japan Amateur Baseball Association (JABA), whilst often referred to in English as industrial or amateur teams, do not fit within the typical definition of either term. They are instead referred to in Japan as shakaijin'yakyū (社会人野球, lit. 'baseball of society members') teams. See 社会人野球 (in Japanese) and Baseball in Japan § Industrial baseball for more information.) Nagai went undrafted while with the club, leading to his gradual shift away from an active playing career.

=== New York Mets ===
In 1998, Nagai got in contact with a Japanese scout for the New York Mets, and was soon hired as the team's bullpen catcher. Nagai stayed with the Mets for two years. During his time with the team, Nagai lived in the same apartment building as Japanese teammate Masato Yoshii and served as Yoshii's pitcher during batting practice.

=== K Sports Baseball Club ===
Nagai returned to JABA following the 1999 MLB season, now playing for the K Sports Baseball Club (ケイ・スポーツベースボールクラブ). Nagai eventually retired from active play while with the club, opting to instead focus on his coaching career going forward.

=== Hamamatsu University ===
In 2006, Nagai took over as manager of Hamamatsu University's student baseball team. Under Nagai, the team won the 2012 Tokai District University Baseball League (東海地区大学野球連盟) Fall Championship.

=== OISCA Hamatsu Kokusai High School ===
In 2019, Nagai was appointed as head coach for the OISCA Hamatsu Kokusai High School (オイスカ浜松国際高等学校) student baseball team.

== Books ==
- Nagai, Koji (August 2013). Thinking about pitch selection: To learn the secrets of pitching and get closer to victory! (考える配球 ピッチングの極意へ、そして勝利へ近づくために!). Natsume Publishing (ナツメ社).
