= Mike Robertson (baseball) =

American baseball player (born 1970)

- First baseman / Outfielder
- Born: October 9, 1970 (age 56); Norwich, Connecticut, U.S.
- Batted: Left Threw: Left

MLB debut
- September 6, 1996, for the Chicago White Sox

Last MLB appearance
- June 26, 1998, for the Arizona Diamondbacks

MLB statistics
- Batting average: .190
- Home runs: 0
- Runs batted in: 4
- Stats at Baseball Reference

Teams
- Chicago White Sox (1996); Philadelphia Phillies (1997); Arizona Diamondbacks (1998)

Michael Francis Robertson (born October 9, 1970) is an American former Major League Baseball (MLB) first baseman and outfielder who played for the Chicago White Sox, Philadelphia Phillies, and Arizona Diamondbacks from 1996 to 1998.

== Biography ==
Born in Norwich, Connecticut, Robertson attended the University of Southern California, and in 1989 and 1990 he played collegiate summer baseball with the Harwich Mariners of the Cape Cod Baseball League. Drafted by the Chicago White Sox in the 3rd round of the 1991 Major League Baseball draft, Robertson made his Major League Baseball debut with the White Sox on September 6, 1996, and appear in his final game on June 26, 1998. Robertson was a member of the inaugural Arizona Diamondbacks team that began play in Major League Baseball in 1998.

Robertson took a job in the Boston Red Sox front office in 2014 as President of Scouting and Player Development. As of 2026, Robertson serves as the pastor of Calvary Chapel West Houston, a Calvary Chapel Association church in the city of Houston.
