= Hanley Frías =

Dominican baseball player (born 1973)

- Infielder
- Born: December 5, 1973 (age 52); Villa Altagracia, Dominican Republic
- Batted: Switch Threw: Right

MLB debut
- June 21, 1997, for the Texas Rangers

Last MLB appearance
- October 1, 2000, for the Arizona Diamondbacks

MLB statistics
- Batting average: .232
- Home runs: 4
- Runs batted in: 25
- Stats at Baseball Reference

Teams
- Texas Rangers (1997); Arizona Diamondbacks (1998–2000)

Hanley Frías (born December 5, 1973) is a Dominican left-handed former baseball infielder, who last played for the Arizona Diamondbacks. He also played for the Texas Rangers at the beginning of his career.

He was an infielder who played for the Rangers and Diamondbacks in a four-year career where he played in 173 games with a BA of .232.
