= Danny Klassen =

Canadian baseball player (born 1975)

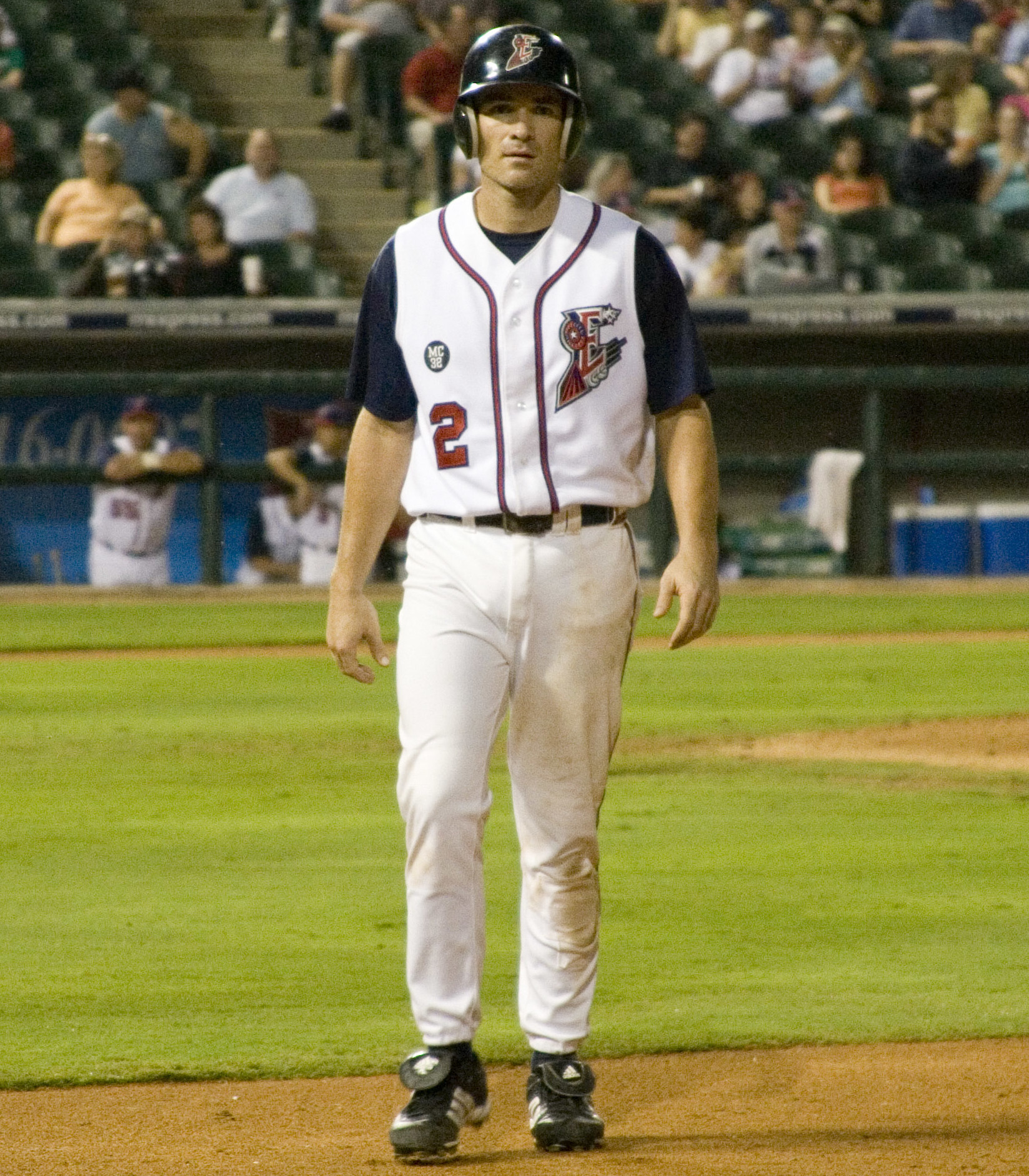
- Klassen with the Round Rock Express in 2007
- Shortstop
- Born: September 22, 1975 (age 49); Leamington, Ontario, Canada
- Batted: Right Threw: Right

MLB debut
- July 4, 1998, for the Arizona Diamondbacks

Last MLB appearance
- September 25, 2003, for the Detroit Tigers

MLB statistics
- Batting average: .226
- Home runs: 6
- Runs batted in: 23
- Stats at Baseball Reference

Teams
- Arizona Diamondbacks (1998–2000, 2002); Detroit Tigers (2003)

Daniel Victor Klassen (born September 22, 1975) is a Canadian former professional baseball infielder. He played four seasons with the Arizona Diamondbacks and one season with the Detroit Tigers of Major League Baseball (MLB).

== Early life ==
Klassen was born to a Mennonite family in Leamington, Ontario and later attended high school at John Carroll Catholic High School in Fort Pierce, Florida. He was selected by the Milwaukee Brewers in the second round of the 1993 Major League Baseball draft.

== Career ==
=== Milwaukee Brewers ===
In 1993, Klassen made his professional debut at the age of 17. He began with the Rookie–level Arizona League Brewers, appearing in 38 games and batting .222 with two home runs and 20 runs batted in. He stole 14 bases and was caught stealing three times. Klassen finished the 1993 season with the Helena Brewers, also a Rookie–level team. In 18 games with Helena, Klassen hit .200 and drove in three runs.

Klassen spent the 1994 season with the Single-A Beloit Brewers of the Midwest League. In 133 games, his average climbed to .260 and he totaled 6 homers, 54 RBI, and 28 stolen bases in 42 attempts. The following year, Klassen remained in Beloit and only appeared in 59 games. He batted .275 and tallied a pair of home runs, 25 runs batted in, and 12 stolen bases.

For the 1996 season, Klassen was promoted to the Stockton Ports of the California League. He made 118 appearances and posted a .269 average. Klassen hit two homers, drove in 46 runs, and stole 14 bases in 22 attempts.

Klassen joined the El Paso Diablos for the 1997 season. Playing in the AA–level Texas League, Klassen appeared in 133 games and his average rose to .331, which would prove to be a career–high. Klassen drove in 81 runs, also the most of his career, while hitting 14 home runs and stealing 16 bases. Klassen's best statistical season in the Brewers organization was also his last. On November 18, 1997, Klassen was selected by the Arizona Diamondbacks in an expansion draft.

=== Arizona Diamondbacks ===
Arizona assigned Klassen to the AAA Tucson Sidewinders of the Pacific Coast League. Over the course of the 1998 season, he posted a .292 average with Tucson, tallying 10 homers, 47 RBI, and only 6 stolen bases over the course of 73 games. On July 4, Klassen made his Major League debut. Facing the Houston Astros, Klassen made four plate appearances, striking out once and drawing three walks. He was caught attempting to steal second base in the fifth inning. He made 29 appearances with the Diamondbacks in 1998, batting .194, with three home runs and 8 RBI. Klassen's first Major League home run came on July 10, as he hit a two–run shot off Cincinnati Reds relief pitcher Danny Graves.

Klassen appeared in one game at the MLB level in 1999, again spending a majority of the season at Tucson. In 64 games with the Sidewinders, Klassen batted .269 with 6 homers, 33 RBI, and 5 steals.

Klassen split the 2000 season between Tucson and Arizona. In the minors, he batted .320 with a pair of home runs in 28 games. With the Diamondbacks, Klassen made 29 appearances and batted .237 with two homers.

In 2001, Klassen played in only seven games, all with the Sidewinders, and hit .222 (4 for 18).

Klassen split the 2002 season between El Paso, Tucson, and Arizona, spending the majority of the year at Tucson. With AA El Paso, now a Diamondbacks affiliate, Klassen appeared in 18 games and batted .231, a percentage point higher than the .230 average he posted in 103 games with Tucson. He hit a pair of home runs with both minor league teams. Klassen saw action in only four games at the Major League level, batting .333 (1 for 3).

=== Detroit Tigers ===
On January 10, 2003, Klassen signed with the Detroit Tigers. He split the 2003 season between the Tigers and their AAA affiliate, the Toledo Mud Hens. Klassen saw action in 112 games with the Mud Hens, batting .246 and tallying 11 homers and 48 RBI. At the major league level, Klassen made 22 appearances. He batted .247, with one home run and 7 RBI. Klassen played in his last MLB game on September 25.

Klassen spent the entirety of the 2004 season with Toledo. In 110 games, he batted .253, hitting 5 home runs and driving in 38 runs. After the season, Klassen became a free agent. On December 14, he signed with the Chicago Cubs. He was then sent to the Houston Astros on April 1, 2005.

Klassen was part of Team Canada in the 2004 Summer Olympics, which finished in fourth place. He was named to play for Canada at the 2006 World Baseball Classic. During the World Baseball Classic, he injured himself and took the 2006 season off.

In 2008, he played for the Houston Astros organization and retired at the end of the season.
