= Yamil Benítez =

Puerto Rican baseball player (born 1972)

- Outfielder
- Born: October 5, 1972 (age 52); San Juan, Puerto Rico
- Batted: Right Threw: Right

MLB debut
- September 16, 1995, for the Montreal Expos

Last MLB appearance
- September 27, 1998, for the Arizona Diamondbacks

MLB statistics
- Batting average: .243
- Home runs: 19
- Runs batted in: 60
- Stats at Baseball Reference

Teams
- Montreal Expos (1995–1996); Kansas City Royals (1997); Arizona Diamondbacks (1998)

Yamil Antonio Benítez (born October 5, 1972) is a Puerto Rican former right-handed outfielder, who last played for the Arizona Diamondbacks. He also played for the Montreal Expos and the Kansas City Royals in his career.

He was an outfielder who played in 169 games for 3 teams. 95 of those games with the Arizona Diamondbacks in their inaugural season. His career batting average was .243 with 19 home runs and 60 RBIs. He was chosen as the 19th player in the Arizona Diamondbacks Expansion Draft.

== See also ==
- List of Major League Baseball players from Puerto Rico
