= Barry Manuel =

American baseball player (born 1965)

- Pitcher
- Born: August 12, 1965 (age 60); Mamou, Louisiana, U.S.
- Batted: Right Threw: Right

Professional debut
- MLB: September 6, 1991, for the Texas Rangers
- NPB: April 21, 1999, for the Seibu Lions

Last appearance
- MLB: August 8, 1998, for the Arizona Diamondbacks
- NPB: April 21, 1999, for the Seibu Lions

MLB statistics
- Win–loss record: 7–2
- Earned run average: 3.87
- Strikeouts: 109

NPB statistics
- Win–loss record: 0–0
- Earned run average: 0.00
- Strikeouts: 0
- Stats at Baseball Reference

Teams
- Texas Rangers (1991–1992); Montreal Expos (1996); New York Mets (1997); Arizona Diamondbacks (1998); Seibu Lions (1999)

Barry Paul Manuel (born August 12, 1965) is a former professional baseball pitcher. He played all or part of five seasons in Major League Baseball between 1991 and 1998, and one season in Nippon Professional Baseball in 1999.

== Career ==
In high school Manuel made the all-state team in 1984 and went on to play for LSU from 1984 to 1987. In 1986 he was voted on the College Baseball All-American team. He was drafted by the Texas Rangers in the second round of the 1987 Major League Baseball draft. Manuel was 26 years old when he broke into the big leagues on September 6, 1991, with the Texas Rangers.

After his major league career, Manuel played one game for the Seibu Lions in Japan in 1999.

Up in till the 2016–2017 school year Barry served as the head baseball coach and the gameday football coordinator for Westminster Christian Academy in Opelousas, Louisiana.

Barry currently serves as the head baseball coach for St Edmund Catholic School in Eunice, Louisiana.
