= Brady Raggio =

American baseball player (born 1972)

- Pitcher
- Born: September 17, 1972 (age 53); Los Angeles, California, U.S.
- Batted: Right Threw: Right

Professional debut
- MLB: April 15, 1997, for the St. Louis Cardinals
- NPB: April 7, 2000, for the Fukuoka Daiei Hawks

Last appearance
- NPB: August 27, 2002, for the Fukuoka Daiei Hawks
- MLB: July 12, 2003, for the Arizona Diamondbacks

MLB statistics
- Win–loss record: 2–3
- Earned run average: 8.10
- Strikeouts: 32

NPB statistics
- Win–loss record: 23–17
- Earned run average: 4.54
- Strikeouts: 176
- Stats at Baseball Reference

Teams
- St. Louis Cardinals (1997–1998); Fukuoka Daiei Hawks (2000–2002); Arizona Diamondbacks (2003)

Brady John Raggio (born September 17, 1972) is an American former Major League Baseball and Nippon Professional Baseball pitcher who played for three seasons. He pitched for the St. Louis Cardinals from 1997 to 1998 and the Arizona Diamondbacks in 2003. From 2000 until 2002, he pitched for the Fukuoka Daiei Hawks.

After his playing career ended in 2005, Raggio worked in the oil business before getting a job with the Triple-A Reno Aces selling corporate sponsorships.

In 2016, Brady joined the PGA TOUR's Barracuda Championship as their Director of Sales.
