= Edwin Díaz (second baseman) =

Puerto Rican baseball player (born 1975)

- Second baseman
- Born: January 15, 1975 (age 51); Bayamon, Puerto Rico
- Batted: Right Threw: Right

MLB debut
- March 31, 1998, for the Arizona Diamondbacks

Last MLB appearance
- August 2, 1999, for the Arizona Diamondbacks

MLB statistics
- Batting average: .167
- Hits: 2
- Runs batted in: 1
- Stats at Baseball Reference

Teams
- Arizona Diamondbacks (1998–1999)

Edwin Rosario Díaz (born January 15, 1975) is a Puerto Rican born former professional baseball player. He was the Opening Day starter at second base for the Arizona Diamondbacks in their inaugural 1998 MLB season. He finished his career with 2 hits in 7 games.

== See also ==
- List of Major League Baseball players from Puerto Rico
