= Brent Brede =

American baseball player (born 1971)

- Outfielder
- Born: September 13, 1971 (age 54); New Baden, Illinois, U.S.
- Batted: Left Threw: Left

Professional debut
- MLB: September 18, 1996, for the Minnesota Twins
- NPB: April 3, 1999, for the Chiba Lotte Marines

Last appearance
- MLB: September 27, 1998, for the Arizona Diamondbacks
- NPB: July 20, 1999, for the Chiba Lotte Marines

MLB statistics
- Batting average: .251
- Home runs: 5
- Runs batted in: 40

NPB statistics
- Batting average: .267
- Home runs: 2
- Runs batted in: 10
- Stats at Baseball Reference

Teams
- Minnesota Twins (1996–1997); Arizona Diamondbacks (1998); Chiba Lotte Marines (1999)

Brent David Brede (born September 13, 1971) is an American former Major League Baseball outfielder.

Drafted by the Minnesota Twins in the 5th round of the 1990 Major League Baseball draft, Brede made his MLB debut with the Twins on September 8, 1996. He was a member of the inaugural Arizona Diamondbacks team that began play in Major League Baseball in 1998, and appeared in his final major game for them on September 27 of that year. He played one season with the Chiba Lotte Marines in 1999 and the 2000 season for the Triple-A Nashville Sounds of the Pacific Coast League before retiring. Brent Brede is now a high school teacher and coaches basketball at his alma mater.
