= Scott Brow =

American baseball player (born 1969)

- Pitcher
- Born: March 17, 1969 (age 57); Butte, Montana, U.S.
- Batted: Right Threw: Right

MLB debut
- April 28, 1993, for the Toronto Blue Jays

Last MLB appearance
- May 31, 1998, for the Arizona Diamondbacks

MLB statistics
- Win–loss record: 3–4
- Earned run average: 6.06
- Strikeouts: 58
- Stats at Baseball Reference

Teams
- Toronto Blue Jays (1993–1994, 1996); Arizona Diamondbacks (1998)

Scott John Brow (born March 17, 1969) is an American former professional baseball pitcher. He played in Major League Baseball (MLB) for the Toronto Blue Jays and Arizona Diamondbacks from 1993 to 1998. He primarily pitched middle relief, but he did start four games in his major league career, three of which were in his rookie season. He graduated from Hillsboro High School in Hillsboro, Oregon, and also graduated from the University of Washington, where he played college baseball for the Huskies from 1988–1990. Brow was a member of the Blue Jays team that won the World Series in 1993, and was a member of the inaugural Diamondbacks in 1998.

== Professional career ==
Brow played in 59 games during his Major League career, 42 of them with the Toronto Blue Jays. He had a career record of 3–4 with a 6.06 ERA, while earning two saves. Brow struck out 58 batters, and pitched 107 career innings.

Brow was drafted by the Toronto Blue Jays in the 1990 MLB draft in the seventh round (204th overall), and signed with the team on June 26, 1990. He worked his way through the Blue Jays farm system, and made his Major League Baseball debut on April 28, 1993, as a starting pitcher against the Kansas City Royals. In his first game, Brow pitched six innings, allowing four runs as he took the loss in a 5-3 Royals victory. On October 3, the last game of the regular season for the Blue Jays, Brow earned his first career victory, pitching six innings and allowing four runs in an 11–6 victory over the Baltimore Orioles. Overall, Brow finished the season with a 1–1 record with a 6.00 ERA in six games, starting three of them. In the postseason, the Blue Jays won the 1993 World Series.

In 1994, the Blue Jays used Brow in the bullpen, as in 18 games, he was 0–3 with a 5.90 ERA and two saves in 29 innings pitched. On May 21, Brow earned his first career save, pitching 0.2 innings of scoreless baseball in a 9–7 win over the Cleveland Indians. Brow ran into injury problems in the 1995 season, and spent the entire season with the Syracuse Chiefs of the International League, the Blue Jays Triple-A affiliate. He returned to Toronto for the 1996 season, where he played in 18 games, starting one of them, and had a 1–0 record with a 5.59 ERA in 38.2 innings pitched.

On September 30, 1996, Brow was claimed off of waivers by the Atlanta Braves from the Blue Jays. He spent the 1997 season with Atlanta's Triple-A affiliate, the Richmond Braves of the International League. After the season, Brow became a free agent, and on December 18, he signed with the Arizona Diamondbacks.

Brow began the 1998 season with the Diamondbacks, and pitched an inning in their inaugural game on March 31, allowing a run in a 9–2 loss to the Colorado Rockies. Brow played in 17 games with Arizona, going 1–0 with a 7.17 ERA in 21.1 innings pitched.

On June 3, the Diamondbacks traded Brow to the New York Yankees for Willie Banks, but Brow did not play in any more MLB games, as with the Yankees, he spent time with their Triple-A affiliate, the Columbus Clippers of the International League. In 1999, Brow played with the Edmonton Trappers of the Pacific Coast League, the Anaheim Angels' Triple-A affiliate, before retiring.
