= Ben Ford (baseball) =

American baseball player (born 1975)

- Pitcher
- Born: August 15, 1975 (age 50); Cedar Rapids, Iowa, U.S.
- Batted: Right Threw: Right

MLB debut
- August 20, 1998, for the Arizona Diamondbacks

Last MLB appearance
- September 26, 2004, for the Milwaukee Brewers

MLB statistics
- Win–loss record: 1–2
- Earned run average: 7.80
- Strikeouts: 23
- Stats at Baseball Reference

Teams
- Arizona Diamondbacks (1998); New York Yankees (2000); Milwaukee Brewers (2004)

Benjamin Cooper Ford (born August 15, 1975) is an American former Major League Baseball right-handed pitcher for the Arizona Diamondbacks, New York Yankees, and Milwaukee Brewers.

Drafted by the New York Yankees in the 20th round of the 1994 Major League Baseball draft, Ford would make his Major League Baseball debut with the Arizona Diamondbacks on August 20, 1998. Ford appeared in his last major league game on September 26, 2004. Ford gave up home run 661 to Barry Bonds on April 13, 2004.

Ford was a member of the inaugural Arizona Diamondbacks team that began play in Major League Baseball in 1998.

== Personal life ==
Ford was born to Gerald and Betty Ford, who are of no relation to the President and First Lady who share their names.
