= Neil Weber =

American baseball player (born 1972)

- Pitcher
- Born: December 6, 1972 (age 53); Newport Beach, California, U.S.
- Batted: Left Threw: Left

MLB debut
- September 11, 1998, for the Arizona Diamondbacks

Last MLB appearance
- September 27, 1998, for the Arizona Diamondbacks

MLB statistics
- Win–loss record: 0–0
- Earned run average: 11.57
- Strikeouts: 4
- Stats at Baseball Reference

Teams
- Arizona Diamondbacks (1998)

Neil Aaron Weber (born December 6, 1972) is an American former Major League Baseball pitcher. Weber played for the Arizona Diamondbacks in 1998. In four career games, he had a 0–0 record with an 11.57 ERA. He batted and threw left-handed.

Weber was drafted by the Montreal Expos in the 8th round of the 1993 amateur draft.

In 2023, Weber was hired as associate head coach of the Lancaster Bible Chargers baseball team. He had previously served as head coach at Palmyra Area High School.
