= Shayne Bennett =

Australian rules footballer and baseball player

- Pitcher
- Born: 10 April 1972 (age 54); Adelaide, South Australia
- Batted: Right Threw: Right

MLB debut
- 22 August, 1997, for the Montreal Expos

Last MLB appearance
- 15 August, 1999, for the Montreal Expos

MLB statistics
- Win–loss record: 5–7
- Earned run average: 5.87
- Strikeouts: 71

KBO statistics
- Win–loss record: 0–2
- Earned run average: 7.32
- Strikeouts: 16

CPBL statistics
- Win–loss record: 0–2
- Earned run average: 7.48
- Strikeouts: 18
- Stats at Baseball Reference

Teams
- Montreal Expos (1997–1999); Doosan Bears (2001); Macoto Gida (2003)

Member of the Australian

Baseball Hall of Fame
- Induction: 2008

Shayne Anthony Bennett (born 10 April 1972) is a former Australian rules footballer who played for North Adelaide in the South Australian National Football League (SANFL), and was a right-handed baseball pitcher, who last played in Major League Baseball with the Montreal Expos on 15 August 1999.

The youngest brother to fellow North Adelaide footballer Peter Bennett, Shayne was a leading junior footballer for North Adelaide and was drafted by Victorian Football League (VFL) team Collingwood at the 1989 VFL Draft with the 56th selection.

Bennett never made his senior debut for Collingwood. Instead, he travelled to the United States and started playing baseball at the College of DuPage.

He was drafted by the Boston Red Sox in the 1993 Major League Baseball draft in the 25th round and, after three years playing in the minor leagues, was traded to the Montreal Expos in January 1996. He played with the Expos in the majors for part of 1997, all of 1998, and part of 1999.

His final professional baseball season was 2000, when he pitched with the top Montreal farm team, the Ottawa Lynx in the International League.

He was also a member of the Australia national baseball team, which finished in sixth place at the 2000 Summer Olympics in Sydney.

== See also ==
- List of players from Australia in Major League Baseball
