= Joel Adamson =

American baseball player (born 1971)

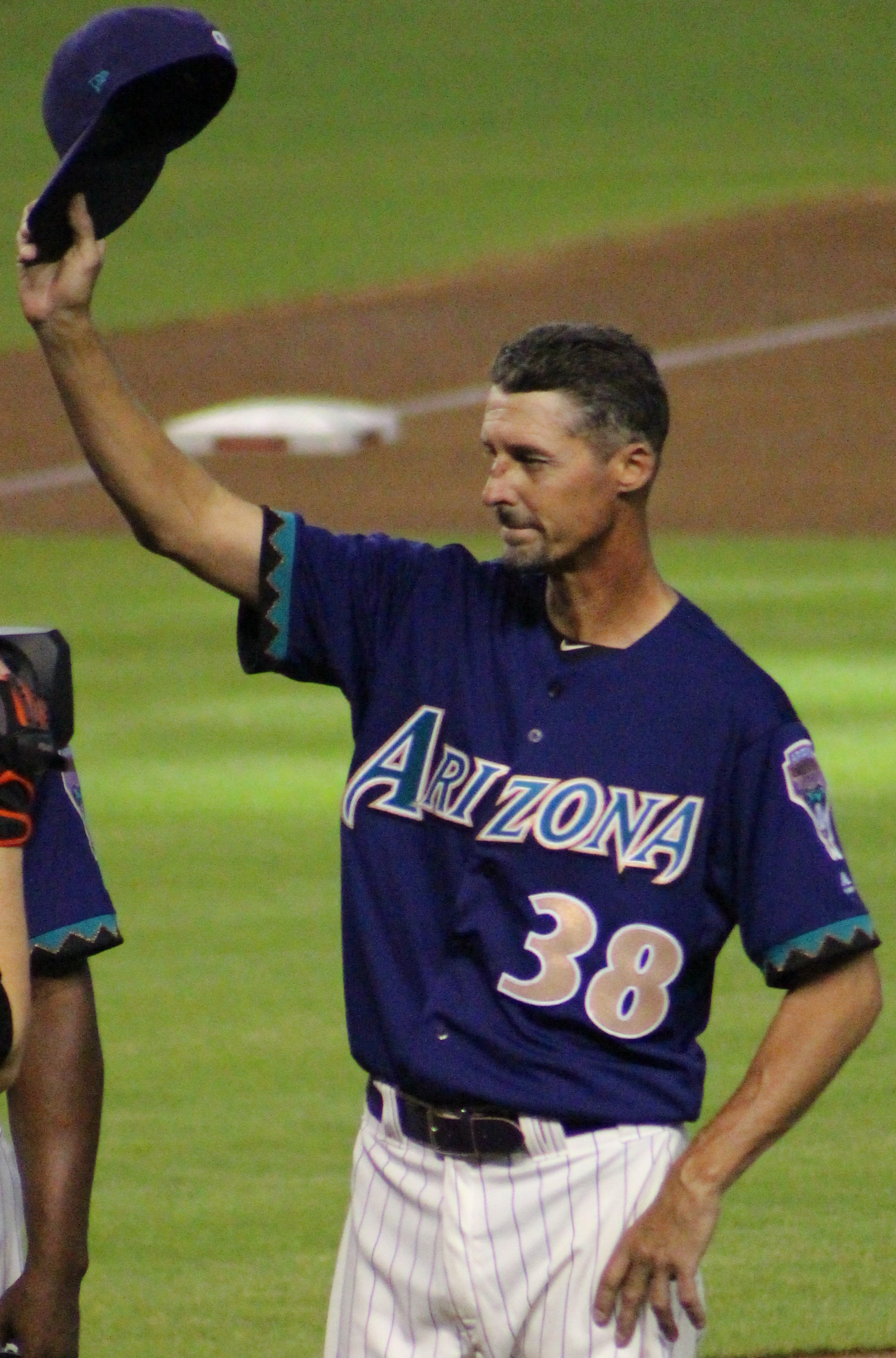
- Adamson at the 2017 Arizona Diamondbacks Alumni Game
- Pitcher
- Born: July 2, 1971 (age 55); Lakewood, California, U.S.
- Batted: Left Threw: Left

MLB debut
- April 10, 1996, for the Florida Marlins

Last MLB appearance
- April 26, 1998, for the Arizona Diamondbacks

MLB statistics
- Win–loss record: 5–6
- Earned run average: 4.89
- Strikeouts: 77
- Stats at Baseball Reference

Teams
- Florida Marlins (1996); Milwaukee Brewers (1997); Arizona Diamondbacks (1998)

Joel Lee Adamson (born July 2, 1971) is an American former professional baseball pitcher. He played for the Florida Marlins, Milwaukee Brewers and Arizona Diamondbacks of Major League Baseball (MLB).

== Career ==
Left handed pitcher Joel Adamson, hailing from Lakewood, California, was first drafted in the seventh round in 1990 by the Philadelphia Phillies. After the 1992 season, they traded him to the pre-debut Marlins with Matt Whisenant for Danny Jackson. Adamson got called up to the major leagues for the Marlins in 1996, and pitched in nine games. The Marlins traded Adamson to the Brewers for a PTBNL after the season, and Milwaukee eventually sent Ed Collins in his place. Adamson played a total of 76 1/3 innings for Milwaukee in 1997, and played five games for the Diamondbacks in 1998.

Adamson was drafted in a Rule 5 Draft by the Boston Red Sox in 1998 from the Oakland Athletics. He appeared in 44 games for three teams with 11 starts over a short 3-year career from 1996 to 1998. He played nine seasons in the minor leagues with seven different teams with five different MLB affiliations.
