= Brian Anderson (pitcher) =

American baseball player and analyst (born 1972)

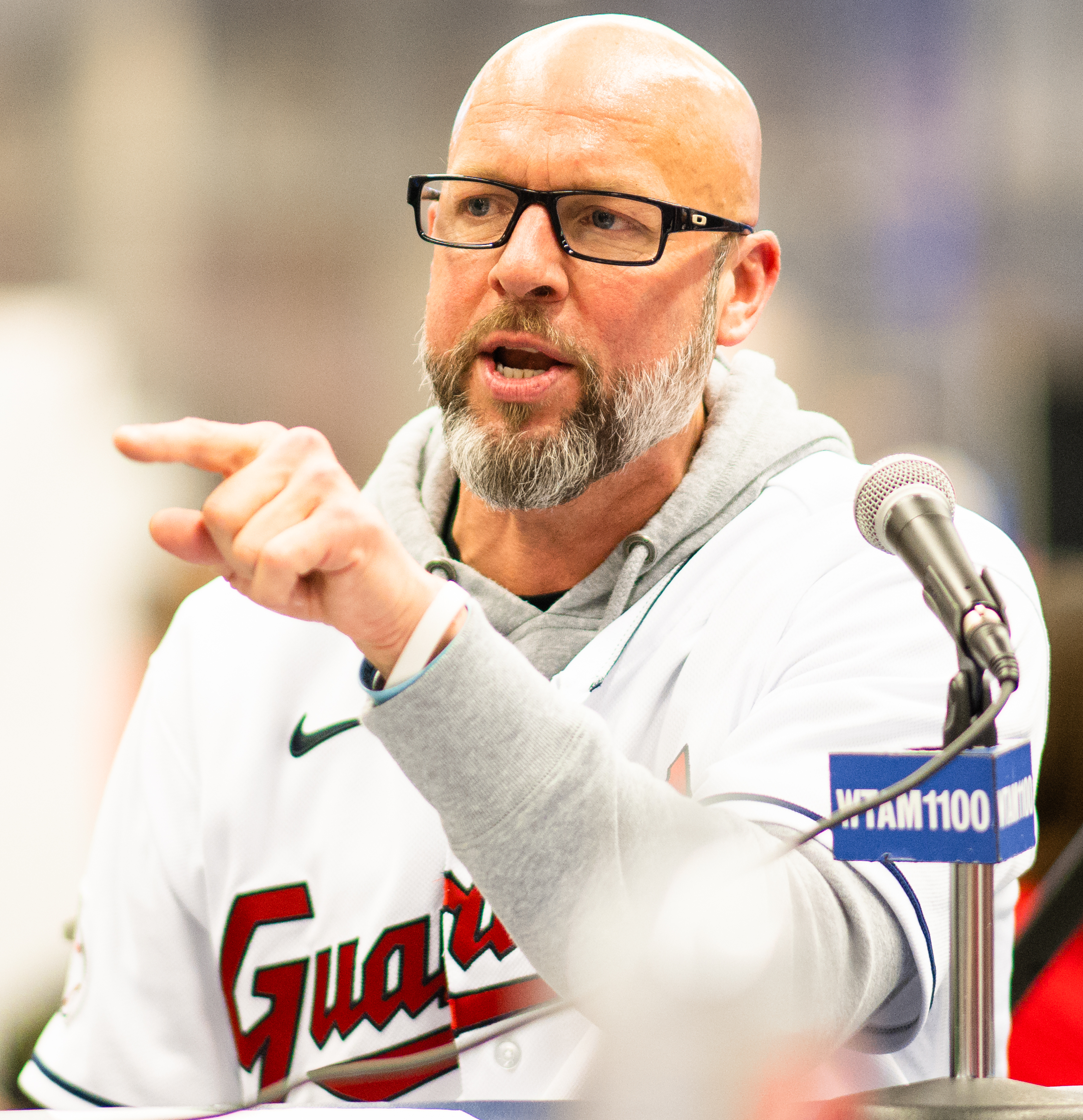
- Anderson in 2023
- Pitcher
- Born: April 26, 1972 (age 54); Portsmouth, Virginia, U.S.
- Batted: Switch Threw: Left

MLB debut
- September 10, 1993, for the California Angels

Last MLB appearance
- May 8, 2005, for the Kansas City Royals

MLB statistics
- Win–loss record: 82–83
- Earned run average: 4.74
- Strikeouts: 723
- Stats at Baseball Reference

Teams
- California Angels (1993–1995); Cleveland Indians (1996–1997); Arizona Diamondbacks (1998–2002); Cleveland Indians (2003); Kansas City Royals (2003–2005)

Career highlights and awards
- World Series champion (2001)

Brian James Anderson (born April 26, 1972) is an American former Major League Baseball pitcher, who played 13 seasons for five teams, as well as a sports broadcaster and coach. Currently, Anderson is the color commentator on the Rays TV crew on MLB Local Media.

== Early life and education ==
Anderson was born on April 26, 1972, in Portsmouth, Virginia. At Geneva High School (Ohio), Anderson was a four-year letterman in baseball, a three-year letterman in golf, and a two-year letterman in basketball. He went on to attend Wright State University in Dayton, Ohio. In 1991 and 1992, he played collegiate summer baseball with the Wareham Gatemen of the Cape Cod Baseball League.

Anderson was selected by the California Angels in the 1st round (3rd pick overall) of the 1993 Major League Baseball draft.

== Professional career ==
Anderson began his major league career with the California Angels in 1993. Between 1993 and 1995, he was 13–13 with a 5.46 ERA.

He was traded prior to the 1996 season to the Cleveland Indians for pitchers Jason Grimsley and Pep Harris. Anderson went 7–3 in two seasons with the Indians. He was on the 1997 playoff roster, in which he made six relief appearances, going 1–0 with 1 save, for a team which made it to the seventh game of the World Series.

Roughly a month after a solid performance during the 1997 World Series, Anderson was the second pick by the Arizona Diamondbacks in the 1997 MLB Expansion Draft.

In his first full season in the Majors, this time as a starter, Anderson went 12–13 with a 4.33 ERA in 32 starts, including 2 complete games. The following season, 1999, he switched between the bullpen and the rotation, totaling 31 appearances, including 19 starts.

In 2000, Anderson was back in the rotation full-time, finishing 11–7 with a career high in innings pitched (213.1) and in strikeouts (104).

In 2001, Anderson went 4–9 with a 5.20 ERA. He pitched to a 1–1 record in 4 postseason games, with an ERA of 2.84.

Anderson was a swingman in 2002 for the Diamondbacks, pitching 35 games while starting 24 of them. His record was 6–11.

In 2003, Anderson signed with his former club, the Cleveland Indians. In his 24 starts with the Tribe, Anderson permitted a whopping 27 unearned runs due to errors the Indians committed.

Anderson was acquired by the Kansas City Royals during the 2003 season for three minor leaguers.

Between Cleveland and Kansas City, Anderson won a career high 14 games while also having a career best 3.78 ERA in 31 starts.

Anderson regressed in 2004, pitching poorly throughout the season. His record was 6–12 with a career high 5.64 ERA in 166 innings.

Anderson's 2005 season ended prematurely when he tore an elbow ligament, necessitating Tommy John surgery. He attempted a comeback in 2006 with the Texas Rangers. He re-injured it during his rehab program and had to undergo a second Tommy John surgery. During his convalescence in 2007, Anderson was a fill-in broadcaster for the Cleveland Indians.

On February 1, 2008, the Tampa Bay Rays signed Anderson to a minor league contract with an invitation to spring training. During spring training however, Anderson left the mound in the middle of a game, and followed that with an MRI. The MRI revealed he had a torn ulnar collateral ligament (for the third time), as well as a torn flexor mass muscle, both in his left elbow. Rays manager Joe Maddon commented by saying, "It can't be repaired; he's done. It's really a big disappointment."

== Post-playing career ==
Following the second Tommy John surgery, Anderson was out of baseball for the 2007 season, during which he occasionally filled in as a broadcaster for the Cleveland Indians on SportsTime Ohio, as well as doing several spring training games and a weekly highlight show.

In 2008, he served temporarily as a color analyst for Rays television broadcasts during a ten-game West Coast road trip, teamed with play-by-play announcer Dewayne Staats while regular Rays broadcast partner Joe Magrane was away on assignment as an analyst for NBC Sports coverage of baseball at the 2008 Summer Olympics. During the 2008 and 2009 seasons, Anderson was an assistant to the pitching coach and worked in the front office for the Rays.

In 2009 and 2010, Anderson again worked as a part-time TV analyst for the Rays, calling about 50 games for which Magrane's successor, Kevin Kennedy, was unavailable. In October 2010, the Rays announced that Anderson would become the team's full-time TV analyst beginning in 2011.

== Personal life ==
Anderson and his wife Jessica Marie married on November 1, 2014 and divorced in 2023. They resided in St. Petersburg, Florida with their daughter, Harper Marie, born November 2015, and son Baker James, born November 27, 2018. Anderson also has two children from a previous marriage, Rylyn Mae and Jackson James.

| Preceded by Kevin Kennedy | Tampa Bay Rays television color announcer 2011–present | Succeeded by current |
