= Clint Sodowsky =

American baseball player (born 1972)

- Pitcher
- Born: July 13, 1972 (age 52); Ponca City, Oklahoma, U.S.
- Batted: Left Threw: Right

MLB debut
- September 4, 1995, for the Detroit Tigers

Last MLB appearance
- May 22, 1999, for the St. Louis Cardinals

MLB statistics
- Win–loss record: 8–14
- Earned run average: 6.17
- Strikeouts: 118
- Stats at Baseball Reference

Teams
- Detroit Tigers (1995–1996); Pittsburgh Pirates (1997); Arizona Diamondbacks (1998); St. Louis Cardinals (1999)

Clint Rea Sodowsky (born July 13, 1972) is an American former professional baseball pitcher. He played in Major League Baseball (MLB) for the Detroit Tigers, Pittsburgh Pirates, Arizona Diamondbacks, and St. Louis Cardinals.

Sodowsky was drafted by the Tigers in the ninth round of the 1991 Major League Baseball draft, and made his MLB debut on September 4, 1995. He appeared in his final game on May 22, 1999.
