= Bobby Chouinard =

Filipino baseball player (born 1972)

- Pitcher
- Born: May 1, 1972 (age 54); Manila, Philippines
- Batted: Right Threw: Right

MLB debut
- May 26, 1996, for the Oakland Athletics

Last MLB appearance
- September 9, 2001, for the Colorado Rockies

MLB statistics
- Win–loss record: 11–8
- Earned run average: 4.57
- Strikeouts: 110
- Stats at Baseball Reference

Teams
- Oakland Athletics (1996); Milwaukee Brewers (1998); Arizona Diamondbacks (1998–1999); Colorado Rockies (2000–2001)

Robert William Chouinard (born May 1, 1972) is a Filipino-American former professional baseball pitcher who played five seasons in Major League Baseball (MLB). A right-handed pitcher, he was selected by the Baltimore Orioles as the 145th overall pick in the fifth round of the 1990 MLB draft. He has played for the Oakland Athletics, Milwaukee Brewers, Arizona Diamondbacks, and Colorado Rockies throughout his career. Born in Manila, Philippines, Chouinard became the first player born in the Philippines to appear in the MLB since Claudio Manela in 1925 and the first to do so following the league’s racial integration.

== High school career ==
Chouinard attended Forest Grove High School in Forest Grove, Oregon, where he played for the school’s baseball team.

== Professional career ==
After being traded from the Baltimore Orioles to the Oakland Athletics along with Allen Plaster on January 15, 1993, in exchange for Harold Baines, Major League Baseball debut with the Athletics on May 26, 1996. He went on to appear in his final major league game on September 9, 2001, as a member of the Colorado Rockies. His MLB career also included stints with the Milwaukee Brewers and Arizona Diamondbacks, during which he served primarily as a relief pitcher.

== Legal issues ==
In December 1999, Chouinard was arrested on Christmas Day following an incident in which he held a loaded firearm to his wife’s head and threatened her life. The following year, he pleaded guilty to aggravated assault and was sentenced to serve four three-month prison terms during Major League Baseball’s offseasons. The sentence allowed him to continue his professional career, with court permission to spend up to 42 hours each week training at Coors Field and visiting his family. As part of the plea agreement, Chouinard was ordered to donate $25,000 to a domestic-violence charity and to appear in ten public-service announcements promoting awareness of domestic abuse.
