= Amaury Telemaco =

Dominican baseball player (born 1974)

- Pitcher
- Born: January 19, 1974 (age 52); Higuey, Dominican Republic
- Batted: Right Threw: Right

MLB debut
- May 16, 1996, for the Chicago Cubs

Last MLB appearance
- May 24, 2005, for the Philadelphia Phillies

MLB statistics
- Win–loss record: 23–35
- Earned run average: 4.94
- Strikeouts: 364
- Stats at Baseball Reference

Teams
- Chicago Cubs (1996–1998); Arizona Diamondbacks (1998–1999); Philadelphia Phillies (1999–2001, 2003–2005); LG Twins (2006)

Amaury Telemaco Regalado (born January 19, 1974) is a Dominican former professional baseball pitcher, who played in Major League Baseball (MLB) for the Chicago Cubs, Arizona Diamondbacks, and Philadelphia Phillies from 1996 to 2005. He was used both as a starter and reliever, throughout his career. Telemaco attended Cristo Rey High School in La Romana, Dominican Republic.

At 6'3", 222 pounds, this right-hander was originally signed as an undrafted free agent by the Cubs in 1991 and made his major league debut on May 16, 1996, at the age of 22, pitching seven innings against the Houston Astros for the win. He gave up only one hit, but he did walk four batters.

Overall, Telemaco went 23–35 in his career with a 4.94 earned run average (ERA). He struck out 364 batters in 561 innings pitched. Telemaco was a typical hitter for a pitcher, batting .121 in 116 career at bats, striking out 51 times. He did hit one triple in his career, though. Telemaco committed two career errors for a .958 fielding percentage.

Telemaco is currently a pitching coach in Minor League Baseball (MiLB). In 2014 he served his fifth consecutive season in that post for the Rookie-level Dominican Summer League Red Sox, an affiliate of the MLB Boston Red Sox.

== Personal life ==
His son, Amaury Telemaco, Jr., was signed as a non-drafted free agent by the Los Angeles Dodgers in 2017.
