= Jorge Fábregas =

American baseball player (born 1970)

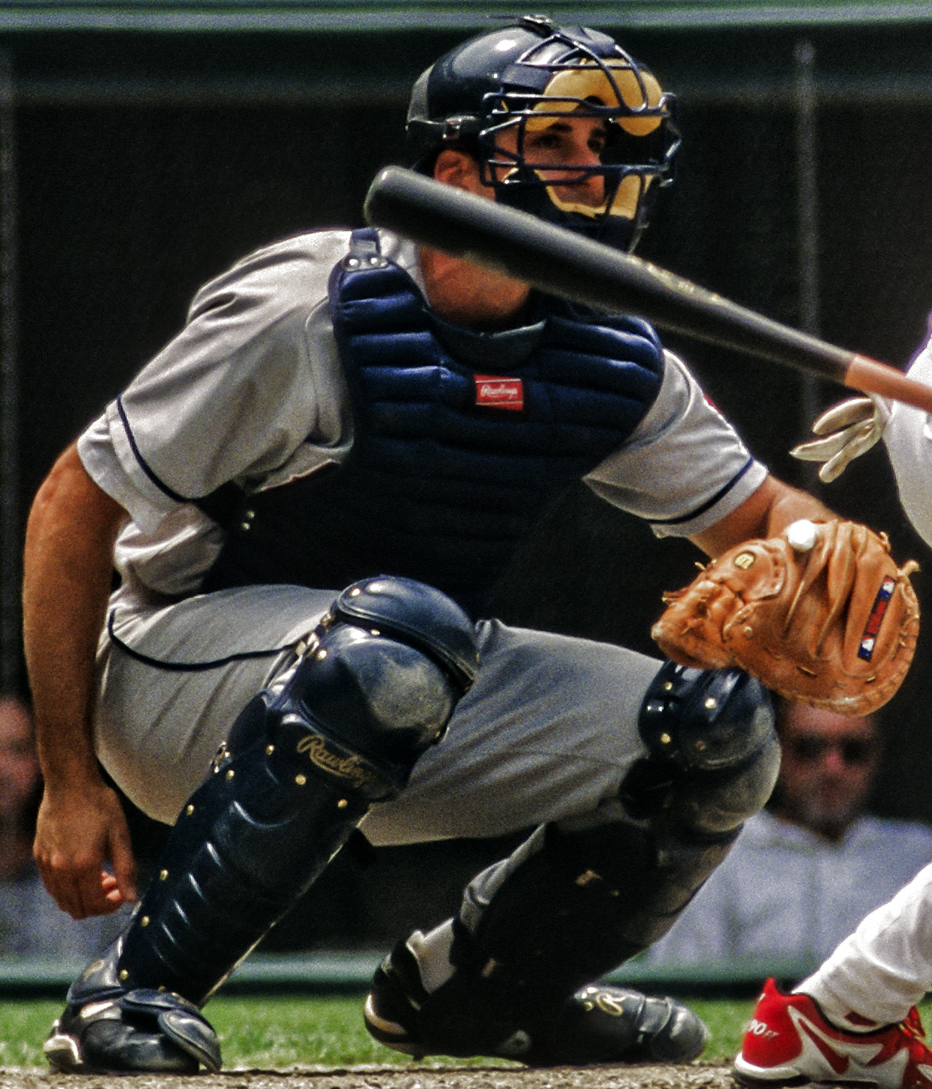
- Fábregas with the California Angels in 1996
- Catcher
- Born: March 13, 1970 (age 56); Miami, Florida, U.S.
- Batted: Left Threw: Right

MLB debut
- April 24, 1994, for the California Angels

Last MLB appearance
- September 27, 2002, for the Milwaukee Brewers

MLB statistics
- Batting average: .241
- Home runs: 23
- Runs batted in: 211
- Stats at Baseball Reference

Teams
- California/Anaheim Angels (1994–1997); Chicago White Sox (1997); Arizona Diamondbacks (1998); New York Mets (1998); Florida Marlins (1999); Atlanta Braves (1999); Kansas City Royals (2000); Anaheim Angels (2001–2002); Milwaukee Brewers (2002)
Medals
Men's baseball
Representing United States
Goodwill Games
Bronze medal – third place	1990 Seattle	Team

Jorge Fábregas (/dʒɔːrdʒ ˈfæbərɡæs/ JORJ FAB-ər-gass, Spanish: [ˈxoɾxe ˈfaβɾeɣas]; born March 13, 1970) is an American former professional baseball catcher who played for eight teams during a nine-year Major League Baseball (MLB) career.

== Career ==
Fábregas an alumnus of the University of Miami. In 1989, he played collegiate summer baseball with the Wareham Gatemen of the Cape Cod Baseball League, and returned to the league in 1990 to play with the Hyannis Mets.

Drafted by the California Angels in the first round of the 1991 Major League Baseball draft, Fábregas made his MLB debut with the California Angels on April 24, 1994. He played his final MLB game, at the age of 32, on September 27, 2002, with the Milwaukee Brewers.

Fábregas played for the California/Anaheim Angels (1994-1997, 2001-2002), Chicago White Sox (1997), Arizona Diamondbacks (1998), New York Mets (1998), Florida Marlins (1999), Atlanta Braves (1999), Kansas City Royals (2000) and Milwaukee Brewers (2002)

With the exception of two seasons during his nine-year career, Fábregas was a back-up catcher. His career batting average was .241 and he had 23 career home runs.
