= 1998 Tampa Bay Devil Rays season =

1998 Tampa Bay Devil Rays
- League: American League
- Division: East
- Ballpark: Tropicana Field
- City: St. Petersburg, Florida
- Record: 63–99 (.389)
- Divisional place: 5th
- Owners: Vince Naimoli
- General managers: Chuck LaMar
- Managers: Larry Rothschild
- Television: Sportschannel Florida; WWWB; WTSP (Joe Magrane, Dewayne Staats)
- Radio: WFLA (Paul Olden, Charlie Slowes)

The 1998 Tampa Bay Devil Rays season was the first season in franchise history. This season, they finished last in the American League East and finished the season with a record of 63–99, 51 games behind the World Champion New York Yankees. They finished with the worst record in the American League and second worst in all of MLB, ahead of only their in-state rivals and defending World Series champion Florida Marlins. Their manager was Larry Rothschild.

Miguel Cairo was the last active player remaining from the Opening Day roster, until retiring after the 2012 season.

== Offseason ==
- March 11, 1997: Luis Polonia was signed as a free agent with the Tampa Bay Devil Rays.
- May 10, 1997: Pete Laforest was signed as a free agent with the Tampa Bay Devil Rays.
- June 3, 1997: Jason Standridge was drafted by the Tampa Bay Devil Rays in the 1st round (31st pick) of the 1997 amateur draft. Player signed June 6, 1997.
- June 3, 1997: Kenny Kelly was drafted by the Tampa Bay Devil Rays in the 2nd round of the 1997 amateur draft. Player signed June 12, 1997.
- November 11, 1997: Mike Kelly was traded by the Cincinnati Reds to the Tampa Bay Devil Rays for a player to be named later. The Tampa Bay Devil Rays sent Dmitri Young (November 18, 1997) to the Cincinnati Reds to complete the trade.
- December 9, 1997: Wade Boggs signed as a free agent with the Tampa Bay Devil Rays.
- December 16, 1997: Scott McClain was signed as a free agent with the Tampa Bay Devil Rays.
- December 18, 1997: Josías Manzanillo was signed as a free agent with the Tampa Bay Devil Rays.
- January 27, 1998: Dave Silvestri was signed as a free agent with the Tampa Bay Devil Rays.
- January 27, 1998: Jerome Walton was signed as a free agent with the Tampa Bay Devil Rays.

=== Expansion Draft ===
==== Round 1 ====
Pick	Player	Position	From	To
1	Tony Saunders	LHP	FLA	TB
4	Quinton McCracken	OF	COL	TB
6	Bobby Abreu	OF	HOU	TB
8	Miguel Cairo	2B	CHC	TB
10	Rich Butler	OF	TOR	TB
12	Bob Smith	3B	ATL	TB
14	Jason Johnson	RHP	PIT	TB
16	Dmitri Young	1B	CIN	TB
18	Esteban Yan	RHP	BAL	TB
20	Mike DiFelice	C	STL	TB
22	Bubba Trammell	OF	DET	TB
24	Andy Sheets	IF	SEA	TB
26	Dennis Springer	RHP	ANA	TB
28	Dan Carlson	RHP	SF	TB

==== Round 2 ====
Pick	Player	Position	From	To
30	Brian Boehringer	RHP	NYY	TB
32	Mike Duvall	LHP	FLA	TB
34	John LeRoy	RHP	ATL	TB
36	Jim Mecir	RHP	BOS	TB
38	Bryan Rekar	RHP	COL	TB
40	Rick Gorecki	RHP	LAD	TB
42	Ramón Tatís	LHP	CHC	TB
44	Kerry Robinson	OF	STL	TB
46	Steve Cox	1B	OAK	TB
48	Albie Lopez	RHP	CLE	TB
50	José Paniagua	RHP	MON	TB
52	Carlos Mendoza	OF	NYM	TB
54	Ryan Karp	LHP	PHI	TB
56	Santos Hernández	RHP	SF	TB

==== Round 3 ====
Pick	Player	Position	From	To
58	Randy Winn	OF	FLA	TB
60	Terrell Wade	LHP	ATL	TB
62	Aaron Ledesma	IF	BAL	TB
64	Brooks Kieschnick	OF	CHC	TB
66	Luke Wilcox	OF	NYY	TB
68	Herbert Perry	IF	CLE	TB
70	Vaughn Eshelman	LHP	OAK	TB

=== 1996–97 MLB June drafts and minor league affiliates ===
The two expansion teams set to debut in 1998, the Devil Rays and Arizona Diamondbacks, had two full seasons to establish scouting and player development systems and were permitted to participate fully in the 1996 and 1997 Major League Baseball drafts. The Devil Rays drafted 29th in 1996 (when they selected 97 players overall) and 31st in 1997 (when they selected 92). The team began developing those players in a farm system with three minor-league affiliates in 1996 and five in 1997.

Among the players selected and signed by Tampa Bay from those drafts were pitcher Dan Wheeler (34th round, 1996), catcher Toby Hall (ninth, 1997), infielder Jared Sandberg (16th, 1996) and outfielder Alex Sánchez (fifth, 1996).

==== 1996 farm system ====
Level	Team	League	Manager
A-Short Season	Hudson Valley Renegades	New York–Penn League	Bump Wills
Rookie	Butte Copper Kings	Pioneer League	Tom Foley
Rookie	GCL Devil Rays	Gulf Coast League	Bill Evers

Hudson Valley affiliation shared with Texas Rangers

==== 1997 farm system ====
Level	Team	League	Manager
A	St. Petersburg Devil Rays	Florida State League	Bill Evers
A	Charleston RiverDogs	South Atlantic League	Scott Fletcher
A-Short Season	Hudson Valley Renegades	New York–Penn League	Julio García
Rookie	Princeton Devil Rays	Appalachian League	Charlie Montoyo
Rookie	GCL Devil Rays	Gulf Coast League	Bobby Ramos

LEAGUE CHAMPIONS: St. Petersburg

== Regular season ==
- March 31, 1998 – The Devil Rays played their inaugural game, as well as their first home game, against the Detroit Tigers. The Tigers won 11–6 in front of an audience of 45,369 fans.
- April 1, 1998 – The Devil Rays enjoyed the first win in their franchise's history, an 11-8 comeback against the Tigers. Rolando Arrojo was the winning pitcher.
- June 22, 1998 – The first interleague game between the Florida Marlins and the Tampa Bay Devil Rays took place at Tropicana Field. The rivalry would be known as the Citrus Series. The Marlins won the game in twelve innings by a score of 3–2.

=== Opening Day starters ===
3	Quinton McCracken	CF
13	Miguel Cairo	2B
12	Wade Boggs	3B
29	Fred McGriff	1B
24	Mike Kelly	LF
44	Paul Sorrento	DH
6	John Flaherty	C
14	Dave Martinez	RF
19	Kevin Stocker	SS
40	Wilson Álvarez	P

=== Season standings ===
AL East
Team	W	L	Pct.	GB	Home	Road
New York Yankees	114	48	.704	—	62‍–‍19	52‍–‍29
Boston Red Sox	92	70	.568	22	51‍–‍30	41‍–‍40
Toronto Blue Jays	88	74	.543	26	51‍–‍30	37‍–‍44
Baltimore Orioles	79	83	.488	35	42‍–‍39	37‍–‍44
Tampa Bay Devil Rays	63	99	.389	51	33‍–‍48	30‍–‍51

=== Record vs. opponents ===
1998 American League record Source: MLB Standings Grid – 1998
Team	ANA	BAL	BOS	CWS	CLE	DET	KC	MIN	NYY	OAK	SEA	TB	TEX	TOR	NL
Anaheim	—	5–6	6–5	5–6	4–7	8–3	6–5	6–5	6–5	5–7	9–3	6–5	5–7	4–7	10–6
Baltimore	6–5	—	6–6	2–9	5–6	10–1	5–6	7–3	3–9	8–3	6–5	5–7	6–5	5–7	5–11
Boston	5–6	6–6	—	5–6	8–3	5–5	8–3	5–6	5–7	9–2	7–4	9–3	6–5	5–7	9–7
Chicago	6–5	9–2	6–5	—	6–6	6–6	8–4	6–6	4–7	4–7	4–7	5–6	5–6	4–6–1	7–9
Cleveland	7–4	6–5	3–8	6–6	—	9–3	8–4	6–6	4–7	3–8	9–2	7–3	4–7	7–4	10–6
Detroit	3–8	1–10	5–5	6–6	3–9	—	6–6	8–4	3–8	7–4	3–8	5–6	3–8	5–6	7–9
Kansas City	5–6	6–5	3–8	4–8	4–8	6–6	—	7–5	0–10	7–4	4–6	8–3	3–8	6–5	9–7
Minnesota	5–6	3–7	6–5	6–6	6–6	4–8	5–7	—	4–7	4–7	2–9	7–4	7–4	4–7	7–9
New York	5–6	9–3	7–5	7–4	7–4	8–3	10–0	7–4	—	8–3	8–3	11–1	8–3	6–6	13–3
Oakland	7–5	3–8	2–9	7–4	8–3	4–7	4–7	7–4	3–8	—	5–7	5–6	6–6	5–6	8–8
Seattle	3–9	5–6	4–7	7–4	2–9	8–3	6–4	9–2	3–8	7–5	—	6–5	5–7	4–7	7–9
Tampa Bay	5–6	7–5	3–9	6–5	3–7	6–5	3–8	4–7	1–11	6–5	5–6	—	4–7	5–7	5–11
Texas	7–5	5–6	5–6	6–5	7–4	8–3	8–3	4–7	3–8	6–6	7–5	7–4	—	7–4	8–8
Toronto	7–4	7–5	7–5	6–4–1	4–7	6–5	5–6	7–4	6–6	6–5	7–4	7–5	4–7	—	9–7

=== Notable transactions ===
- May 26, 1998: Jerome Walton was released by the Tampa Bay Devil Rays.
- June 2, 1998: Aubrey Huff was drafted by the Tampa Bay Devil Rays in the 5th round of the 1998 amateur draft. Player signed June 17, 1998.
- July 1, 1998: Josías Manzanillo was released by the Tampa Bay Devil Rays.

=== Citrus Series ===
The season series each year between the Devil Rays and the Florida Marlins has come to be known as the Citrus Series. In 1998, the Marlins won the series 3 games to 1.

- June 22 - Devil Rays vs Marlins: 2 – 3
- June 23 - Devil Rays vs Marlins: 6 – 4
- June 24 - Devil Rays @ Marlins: 4 – 8
- June 25 - Devil Rays @ Marlins: 1 – 5

=== Roster ===
1998 Tampa Bay Devil Rays
Roster
Pitchers: 37 Scott Aldred; 40 Wilson Álvarez; 30 Rolando Arrojo; 46 Dan Carlson; 13 Mike Duvall; 48 Dave Eiland; 28 Eddie Gaillard; 55 Rick Gorecki; 39 Roberto Hernández; 41 Jason Johnson; 32 Albie Lopez; 45 Jim Mecir; 57 Brad Pennington; 28 Bryan Rekar; 36,53 Matt Ruebel; 80 Julio Santana; 31 Tony Saunders; 35 Dennis Springer; 52 Ramón Tatís; 36 Terrell Wade; 27 Rick White; 43 Esteban Yan	Catchers: 8 Mike DiFelice; 23 John Flaherty; 16 Tim Laker; Infielders: 12 Wade Boggs; 13,20 Miguel Cairo; 4 Aaron Ledesma; 20 Scott McClain; 29 Fred McGriff; 17 Dave Silvestri; 9 Bob Smith; 19 Kevin Stocker	Outfielders: 10 Rich Butler; 24 Mike Kelly; 14 Dave Martinez; 3 Quinton McCracken; 15 Kerry Robinson; 44 Paul Sorrento; 21 Bubba Trammell; 27 Jerome Walton; 2 Randy Winn	Manager: 11 Larry Rothschild; Coaches: 25 Orlando Gómez (Bullpen); 22 Billy Hatcher (First Base); 5 Steve Henderson (Hitting); 33 Frank Howard (Bench); 7 Greg Riddoch (Third Base); 38 Rick Williams (Pitching)

== Player stats ==
= Indicates team leader

=== Batting ===
==== Starters by position ====
Note: Pos = Position; G = Games played; AB = At bats; H = Hits; HR = Home runs; RBI = Runs batted in; Avg. = Batting average; SB = Stolen bases

Pos	Player	G	AB	H	HR	RBI	Avg.	SB
C	John Flaherty	91	304	63	3	24	.207	0
1B	Fred McGriff	151	564	160	19	81	.284	7
2B	Miguel Cairo	150	515	138	5	46	.268	19
3B	Bob Smith	117	370	102	11	55	.276	5
SS	Kevin Stocker	112	336	70	6	25	.208	5
LF	Quinton McCracken	155	614	179	7	59	.292	19
CF	Randy Winn	109	338	94	1	17	.278	26
RF	Dave Martinez	90	309	79	3	20	.256	8
DH	Paul Sorrento	137	435	98	17	57	.225	2

==== Other batters ====
Note: G = Games played; AB = At bats; H = Hits; HR = Home runs; RBI = Runs batted in; Avg. = Batting average; SB = Stolen bases

Player	G	AB	H	HR	RBI	Avg.	SB
Wade Boggs	123	435	122	7	52	.280	3
Aaron Ledesma	95	299	97	0	29	.324	9
Mike Kelly	106	279	67	10	33	.240	13
Mike Difelice	84	248	57	3	23	.230	0
Rich Butler	72	217	49	7	20	.226	4
Bubba Trammell	59	199	57	12	35	.286	0
Jerome Walton	12	34	11	0	3	.324	0
Scott McClain	9	20	2	0	0	.100	0
Dave Silvestri	8	14	1	0	0	.071	0
Tim Laker	3	5	1	0	0	.200	0
Kerry Robinson	2	3	0	0	0	.000	0

=== Pitching ===
==== Starting pitchers ====
Note: G = Games pitched; IP = Innings pitched; W = Wins; L = Losses; ERA = Earned run average; SO = Strikeouts

Player	G	IP	W	L	ERA	SO
Rolando Arrojo	32	202.0	14	12	3.56	152
Tony Saunders	31	192.1	6	15	4.12	172
Wilson Álvarez	25	142.2	6	14	4.73	107
Julio Santana	32	140.1	5	6	4.23	60
Dennis Springer	29	115.2	3	11	5.45	46
Bryan Rekar	16	86.2	2	8	4.98	55

==== Relief pitchers ====
Note: G = Games pitched; IP = Innings pitched; W = Wins; L = Losses; ERA = Earned run average; SO = Strikeouts; SV = Saves

Player	G	IP	W	L	ERA	SO	SV
Roberto Hernández	67	71.1	2	6	4.04	55	26
Esteban Yan	64	88.2	5	4	3.86	77	1
Jim Mecir	68	84.0	7	2	3.11	77	0
Albie Lopez	54	79.2	7	4	2.60	62	1
Rick White	38	68.2	2	6	3.80	39	0
Scott Aldred	48	31.1	0	0	3.73	21	0
Dan Carlson	10	17.2	0	0	7.64	16	0
Ramón Tatís	22	11.2	0	0	13.89	5	0
Matt Ruebel	7	8.2	0	2	6.23	6	0
Eddie Gaillard	6	7.2	0	0	5.87	5	0
Mike Duvall	3	4.0	0	0	6.75	1	0
Brad Pennington	1	0.0	0	0	inf	0	0

==== Other pitchers ====
Note: G = Games pitched; IP = Innings pitched; W = Wins; L = Losses; ERA = Earned run average; SO = Strikeouts; SV = Saves

Player	G	IP	W	L	ERA	SO	SV
Jason Johnson	13	60.0	2	5	5.70	36	0
Rick Gorecki	3	16.2	1	2	4.86	8	0
Terrell Wade	2	10.2	1	1	5.06	8	0
Dave Eiland	1	2.2	0	1	20.25	1	0

== Game log ==
Game Log
March (0-1)

#	Date	Opponent	Score	Win	Loss	Save	Attendance	Record
1	March 31	Tigers	11 – 6	Thompson (1–0)	Álvarez (0–1)		45,369	0–1

April (12-13)

#	Date	Opponent	Score	Win	Loss	Save	Attendance	Record
2	April 1	Tigers	11 – 8	Arrojo (1–0)	Moehler (0–1)		30,109	1-1
3	April 2	Tigers	7 – 1	Yan (1–0)	Worrell (0–1)		28,261	2–1
4	April 3	White Sox	10 – 4	Baldwin (1–0)	Gorecki (0–1)		31,816	2-2
5	April 4	White Sox	8 – 2	Springer (1–0)	Eyre (0–1)		36,599	3–2
6	April 5	White Sox	5 – 0	Álvarez (1-1)	Bere (0–1)		33,733	4–2
7	April 7	@ Tigers	3 – 1	Florie (0–1)	Arrojo (1-1)	Jones (1)	45,768	4–3
8	April 10	@ White Sox	3 – 0	Sirotka (1-1)	Saunders (0–1)	Karchner (1)	13,563	4-4
9	April 11	@ White Sox	5 – 1	Gorecki (1-1)	Bere (0–2)		17,322	5–4
10	April 12	@ White Sox	4 – 1	Álvarez (2–1)	Navarro (0–2)	Hernández (1)	14,004	6–4
11	April 13	Twins	13 – 12 (14)	Yan (1–0)	Trombley (0–2)		31,969	7–4
12	April 14	Twins	8 – 2	Radke (2–1)	Springer (1-1)		34,337	7–5
13	April 16	@ Angels	6 – 5	Saunders (1-1)	Holtz (1-1)	Hernández (2)	22,906	8–5
14	April 17	@ Angels	5 – 0	Finley (3–0)	Gorecki (1–2)		31,516	8–6
15	April 18	@ Angels	8 – 1	Álvarez (3–1)	Dickson (0–3)		37,878	9–6
16	April 19	@ Angels	6 – 0	Arrojo (2–1)	Watson (0–2)		34,580	10–6
17	April 21	@ Rangers	4 – 0	Sele (4–0)	Springer (1–2)		26,776	10–7
18	April 22	@ Rangers	7 – 2	Helling (4–0)	Saunders (1–2)		30,770	10–8
19	April 23	@ Rangers	12 – 5	Johnson (1–0)	Oliver (0–3)		33,319	11–8
20	April 24	Angels	10 – 3	Watson (1–2)	Álvarez (3–2)		27,767	11–9
21	April 25	Angels	7 – 1	Hill (4–1)	Arrojo (2-2)		33,395	11–10
22	April 26	Angels	2 – 1	Olivares (1–0)	Springer (1–3)	Percival (5)	26,882	11-11
23	April 27	Athletics	7 – 6	Mathews (1–0)	Hernández (0–1)	Taylor (4)	25,484	11–12
24	April 28	Athletics	4 – 3	Small (1–0)	Johnson (1-1)	Taylor (5)	25,138	11–13
25	April 29	@ Twins	2 – 0	Tewksbury (1–0)	Álvarez (3-3)	Aguilera (5)	8,964	11–14
26	April 30	@ Twins	2 – 0	Arrojo (3–2)	Hawkins (0–3)		8,860	12–14

May (12-16)

#	Date	Opponent	Score	Win	Loss	Save	Attendance	Record
27	May 1	@ Indians	7 – 5	Colón (2–1)	Springer (1–4)	Jackson (10)	42,712	12–15
28	May 2	@ Indians	5 – 1	Ogea (1-1)	Saunders (1–3)		42,525	12–16
29	May 3	@ Indians	10 – 8	Mesa (3–0)	Hernández (0–2)		42,597	12–17
30	May 5	@ Royals	4 – 2	Pichardo (3–0)	Álvarez (3–4)	Montgomery (6)	12,096	12–18
31	May 6	@ Royals	5 – 0	Arrojo (4–2)	Rusch (3–4)		11,401	13–18
32	May 8	Orioles	8 – 2	Rhodes (3–0)	Lopez (0–1)		35,355	13–19
33	May 9	Orioles	7 – 0	Mussina (4–2)	Springer (1–5)		42,486	13–20
34	May 10	Orioles	4 – 3	Yan (3–0)	Mills (0–1)	Hernández (3)	34,123	14–20
35	May 11	Indians	4 – 2	Arrojo (5–2)	Burba (3–4)	Hernández (4)	30,334	15–20
36	May 12	Indians	6 – 5 (15)	Santana (1–0)	Jackson (0–1)		30,194	16–20
37	May 13	Royals	4 – 0	Rapp (3-3)	Saunders (1–4)		25,244	16–21
38	May 14	Royals	10 – 2	Belcher (2–5)	Springer (1–6)		24,296	16–22
39	May 15	@ Orioles	4 – 1	Álvarez (4-4)	Erickson (4–2)	Hernández (5)	47,421	17–22
40	May 16	@ Orioles	5 – 2	Arrojo (6–2)	Belcher (2–5)	Hernández (6)	47,538	18–22
41	May 17	@ Orioles	7 – 3	Mecir (1–0)	Mills (0–2)		47,628	19–22
42	May 18	@ Orioles	6 – 3	Lopez (1-1)	Drabek (3–5)	Hernández (7)	45,033	20–22
43	May 19	@ Blue Jays	3 – 1	Williams (4–2)	Springer (1–7)	Myers (10)	25,662	20–23
44	May 20	@ Blue Jays	9 – 1	Hentgen (6–3)	Álvarez (4–5)		26,107	20–24
45	May 21	@ Blue Jays	6 – 1	Guzmán (2–6)	Arrojo (6–3)		30,108	20–25
46	May 22	@ Mariners	5 – 2	Johnson (2–1)	Moyer (2–5)	Hernández (8)	29,522	21–25
47	May 23	@ Mariners	6 – 3	Yan (4–0)	Ayala (0–4)	Hernández (9)	35,819	22–25
48	May 24	@ Mariners	3 – 1	Johnson (4–3)	Springer (1–8)		46,867	22–26
49	May 25	@ Athletics	8 – 2	Oquist (1–3)	Ruebel (0–1)		13,199	22–27
50	May 26	@ Athletics	7 – 2	Arrojo (7–3)	Candiotti (4–5)		9,801	23–27
51	May 28	Mariners	5 – 2	Moyer (3–5)	Johnson (2-2)		27,017	23–28
52	May 29	Mariners	6 – 2	Johnson (5–3)	Saunders (1–5)		32,142	23–29
53	May 30	Mariners	5 – 2	Springer (2–8)	Cloude (3-3)	Hernández (10)	40,212	24–29
54	May 31	Mariners	11 – 6	Swift (4–3)	White (0–1)		35,184	24–30

June (10-17)

#	Date	Opponent	Score	Win	Loss	Save	Attendance	Record
55	June 1	Rangers	11 – 6	Arrojo (8–3)	Burkett (4–3)	Hernández (11)	24,388	25–30
56	June 2	Rangers	11 – 6	Witt (5–3)	Johnson (2–3)		24,477	25–31
57	June 3	@ Yankees	7 – 1	Hernández (1–0)	Saunders (1–6)		27,291	25–32
58	June 4	@ Yankees	6 – 1	Irabu (5–1)	Springer (2–9)		22,759	25–33
59	June 5	Expos	5 – 2	Hermanson (4-4)	White (0–2)		24,025	25–34
60	June 6	Expos	7 – 5	Telford (3–2)	Ruebel (0–2)	Urbina (14)	26,501	25–35
61	June 7	Expos	4 – 3 (11)	Lopez (2–1)	Kline (1–3)		26,334	26–35
62	June 8	@ Mets	3 – 0	Reed (7–3)	Springer (2–10)		24,186	26–36
63	June 9	@ Mets	5 – 4 (11)	Mecir (2–0)	Hudek (0–3)	Hernández (12)	30,336	27–36
64	June 10	@ Mets	3 – 2	Leiter (7–3)	White (0–3)	Rojas (2)	21,682	27–37
65	June 12	@ Red Sox	5 – 1	Wakefield (7–3)	Arrojo (8–4)		31,994	27–38
66	June 14	@ Red Sox	3 – 2	Gordon (4–1)	Lopez (2-2)		27,768	27–39
67	June 15	Blue Jays	8 – 7	White (1–3)	Quantrill (0–3)	Hernández (13)	24,122	28–39
68	June 16	Blue Jays	4 – 3	Mecir (3–0)	Myers (2-2)		24,278	29–39
69	June 17	Blue Jays	2 – 1	Arrojo (9–4)	Guzmán (3–9)	Hernández (14)	24,394	30–39
70	June 18	Red Sox	7 – 5 (10)	Wasdin (4–3)	Yan (4–1)	Gordon (21)	30,177	30–40
71	June 19	Red Sox	4 – 1	Avery (4–1)	Saunders (1–7)	Gordon (22)	32,375	30–41
72	June 20	Red Sox	8 – 5	Santana (2–0)	Saberhagen (8–5)	Hernández (15)	41,169	31–41
73	June 21	Red Sox	3 – 1	Martínez (9–2)	Johnson (2–4)	Gordon (23)	40,348	31–42
74	June 22	Marlins	3 – 2 (12)	Alfonseca (1–2)	Mecir (3–1)		25,623	31–43
75	June 23	Marlins	6 – 4	Lopez (3–2)	Dempster (1–2)	Hernández (16)	27,523	32–43
76	June 24	@ Marlins	8 – 4	Meadows (6-6)	Saunders (1–8)		19,501	32–44
77	June 25	@ Marlins	5 – 1	Hernández (6–4)	Santana (2–1)		16,826	32–45
78	June 26	@ Phillies	7 – 0	Green (6–4)	Johnson (2–5)		17,559	32–46
79	June 27	@ Phillies	5 – 1	Arrojo (10–4)	Schilling (7–8)		44,262	33–46
80	June 28	@ Phillies	5 – 4	Lopez (4–2)	Gomes (6–3)	Hernández (17)	25,157	34–46
81	June 30	Braves	7 – 2	Neagle (9–6)	Saunders (1–9)		41,047	34–47

July (9-16)

#	Date	Opponent	Score	Win	Loss	Save	Attendance	Record
82	July 1	Braves	6 – 5	Springer (5–3)	Hernández (0–3)	Ligtenberg (8)	41,100	34–48
83	July 2	Braves	6 – 0	Maddux (12–2)	Arrojo (10–5)		40,749	34–49
84	July 3	@ Blue Jays	3 – 2 (10)	Myers (3–2)	Yan (4–2)		25,625	34–50
85	July 4	@ Blue Jays	8 – 0	Carpenter (5–3)	Springer (2–11)		29,198	34–51
86	July 5	@ Blue Jays	2 – 1	Quantrill (1–3)	White (1–4)	Myers (23)	31,240	34–52
87	July 9	Yankees	2 – 0	Pettitte (11–5)	Rekar (0–1)	Rivera (23)	38,386	34–53
88	July 10	Yankees	8 – 4	Irabu (7–3)	Álvarez (4–6)	Mendoza (1)	40,363	34–54
89	July 11	Yankees	2 – 0	Cone (13–2)	Arrojo (10–6)	Rivera (24)	44,589	34–55
90	July 12	Yankees	9 – 2	Stanton (4–0)	Hernández (0–4)		43,373	34–56
91	July 13	Red Sox	2 – 0	Avery (6–2)	Santana (2-2)	Gordon (26)		34–57
92	July 14	Red Sox	5 – 4	Lopez (5–2)	Mahay (1-1)		27,310	35–57
93	July 15	@ Angels	4 – 2	Hasegawa (4–1)	Álvarez (4–7)	Percival (27)	19,681	35–58
94	July 16	@ Angels	8 – 1	Arrojo (11–6)	Sparks (3–2)		24,085	36–58
95	July 17	@ Rangers	7 – 4	Oliver (5–7)	Mecir (3–2)	Wetteland (26)	33,876	36–59
96	July 18	@ Rangers	9 – 8	Crabtree (4–0)	Yan (4–3)		44,356	36–60
97	July 19	@ Rangers	7 – 4	Burkett (6–10)	Rekar (0–2)	Wetteland (27)	34,700	36–61
98	July 21	Mariners	8 – 3	Moyer (7-7)	Álvarez (4–8)		30,298	36–62
99	July 22	Mariners	7 – 5	Lopez (6–2)	Johnson (9-9)	Hernández (18)	31,558	37–62
100	July 24	Athletics	6 – 0	Saunders (2–9)	Oquist (6–7)		25,476	38–62
101	July 25	Athletics	7 – 5	Hernández (1–4)	Rogers (10–4)		30,179	39–62
102	July 26	Athletics	3 – 1	Álvarez (5–8)	Candiotti (5–13)	Yan (1)	37,194	40–62
103	July 27	Athletics	11 – 5	Rekar (1–2)	Stein (4–6)		24,359	41–62
104	July 28	@ White Sox	4 – 1	Baldwin (6–4)	Arrojo (11–7)	Simas (10)	18,402	41–63
105	July 29	@ White Sox	7 – 2	Saunders (3–9)	Parque (2–4)		17,387	42–63
106	July 31	Tigers	5 – 1	Santana (3–2)	Greisinger (1–6)	Hernández (19)	25,654	43–63

August (10-20)

#	Date	Opponent	Score	Win	Loss	Save	Attendance	Record
107	August 1	Tigers	8 – 0	Moehler (12–7)	Álvarez (5–9)		28,130	43–64
108	August 2	Tigers	3 – 2	Powell (2-2)	Rekar (1–3)	Jones (19)	26,120	43–65
109	August 3	White Sox	6 – 1	Baldwin (7–4)	Arrojo (11–8)		24,698	43–66
110	August 4	White Sox	8 – 6	Castillo (5–4)	Saunders (3–10)	Simas (11)	24,866	43–67
111	August 5	White Sox	7 – 3	Hernández (2–4)	Howry (0–2)		24,814	44–67
112	August 7	Indians	5 – 1	Gooden (4–6)	Álvarez (5–10)		32,254	44–68
113	August 8	Indians	6 – 2	Nagy (10–7)	Rekar (1–4)		37,108	44–69
114	August 9	Indians	2 – 1	Mecir (4–2)	Assenmacher (2–5)		36,641	45–69
115	August 10	Orioles	2 – 1	Guzmán (8–12)	Saunders (3–11)	Benítez (16)	26,352	45–70
116	August 11	Orioles	2 – 1	Mecir (5–2)	Benítez (4–3)		26,472	46–70
117	August 12	Orioles	7 – 0	Erickson (12–9)	Álvarez (5–11)		29,211	46–71
118	August 13	@ Royals	6 – 4	Montgomery (2–4)	Hernández (2–5)		18,289	46–72
119	August 14	@ Royals	11 – 9	Haney (5-5)	Arrojo (11–9)	Service (3)	28,133	46–73
120	August 15	@ Royals	8 – 6	Mecir (6–2)	Bones (0–1)	Hernández (20)	18,706	47–73
121	August 16	@ Royals	8 – 3	Santana (4–2)	Belcher (11–10)		16,762	48–73
122	August 17	@ Indians	4 – 3	Colón (13–6)	Álvarez (5–12)	Jackson (30)	43,139	48–74
123	August 18	@ Indians	4 – 2	Gooden (5–6)	Rekar (1–5)	Jackson (31)	42,967	48–75
124	August 19	Orioles	6 – 4	Mussina (12–6)	Arrojo (11–10)	Benítez (19)	44,530	48–76
125	August 20	Orioles	4 – 2	Saunders (4–11)	Rhodes (3–4)	Hernández (21)	44,566	49–76
126	August 21	Royals	6 – 5	Whisenant (2–1)	Yan (4-4)	Montgomery (27)	25,638	49–77
127	August 22	Royals	3 – 2	Rosado (7–9)	Álvarez (5–13)	Montgomery (28)	27,346	49–78
128	August 23	Royals	11 – 5	Rapp (10–11)	Rekar (1–6)		33,123	49–79
129	August 25	Twins	4 – 1	Rodriguez (4–2)	Arrojo (11-11)	Aguilera (32)	23,126	49–80
130	August 26	Twins	7 – 3	Tewksbury (6–9)	Saunders (4–12)	Aguilera (33)	23,059	49–81
131	August 27	Twins	10 – 3	Santana (5–2)	Milton (7–11)		23,314	50–81
132	August 28	@ Tigers	4 – 3	Mecir (7–2)	Moehler (12–11)	Hernández (22)	19,534	51–81
133	August 29	@ Tigers	10 – 6	Springer (3–11)	Thompson (10–12)		?	52–81
134	August 29	@ Tigers	8 – 2	Greisinger (4–7)	Rekar (1–7)		16,406	52–82
135	August 30	@ Tigers	10 – 5	Arrojo (12–11)	Powell (3–5)	Hernández (23)	14,765	53–82
136	August 31	@ Twins	2 – 1	Tewksbury (7–9)	Saunders (4–13)	Aguilera (34)	7,888	53–83

September (10-16)

#	Date	Opponent	Score	Win	Loss	Save	Attendance	Record
137	September 1	@ Twins	6 – 5	Serafini (7–4)	Hernandez (2–6)		7.947	53–84
138	September 2	@ Twins	4 – 1	Yan (5–4)	Hawkins (7–13)	Lopez (1)	7,165	54–84
139	September 3	@ Twins	5 – 4 (12)	Guardado (3–1)	White (1–5)		7,072	54–85
140	September 4	@ Athletics	5 – 2	Arrojo (13–11)	Haynes (10–7)	Hernandez (24)	8.198	55–85
141	September 5	@ Athletics	3 – 0	Rogers (13–7)	Saunders (4–14)		34,193	55-86
142	September 6	@ Athletics	9 – 2	Candiotti (11–15)	Santana (5–3)		35,162	55-87
143	September 8	@ Mariners	10 – 0	Alvarez (6–13)	Suzuki (0–1)		20,679	56-87
144	September 9	@ Mariners	5 – 2	Abbot (0–1)	Arrojo (13–12)	Timlin (14)	22,256	56-88
145	September 11	Rangers	3 – 2	Saunders (5–14)	Stottlemyre (12–13)	Hernandez (25)	28,522	57-88
146	September 12	Rangers	8 – 2	Helling (19–7)	Santana (5–4)		31,278	57-89
147	September 13	Rangers	10 – 5	White (2–5)	Loaiza (9–9)		34,007	58-89
148	September 14	Angels	4 – 2	Hasegawa (8–3)	Lopez (6–3)	Percival (40)	24,279	58-90
149	September 15	Angels	8 – 1	Arrojo (14–12)	Juden (8–14)		24,347	59-90
150	September 16	Yankees	7 – 0	Saunders (6–14)	Pettitte (16–10)		38,862	60-90
151	September 17	Yankees	4 – 0	Irabu (12–9)	Santana (5–5)		38,820	60-91
152	September 18	Blue Jays	6 – 1	Rekar (2–7)	Escobar (6–3)		32,053	61-91
153	September 19	Blue Jays	7 – 5	Lopez (7–3)	Van Ryn (0–2)	Hernandez (26)	35,689	62-91
154	September 20	Blue Jays	7 – 5	Risley (2–4)	Lopez (7–4)		32,183	62-92
155	September 21	@ Red Sox	4 – 3	Saberhagen (15–7)	Saunders (6–15)	Gordon (43)	?	62-93
156	September 21	@ Red Sox	8 – 4	Wade (1–0)	Reyes (3–3)		23,379	63-93
157	September 22	@ Red Sox	11 – 2	Schourek (8–9)	Santana (5–6)		20,399	63-94
158	September 23	@ Red Sox	5 – 4	Avery (10–7)	Rekar (2–8)	Gordon (44)	23,240	63-95
159	September 24	@ Yankees	5 – 2	Buddie (4–1)	Alvarez (6–14)	Nelson (3)	24,555	63-96
160	September 25	@ Yankees	6 – 1	Hernandez (12–4)	Eiland (0–1)		32,447	63-97
161	September 26	@ Yankees	3 – 1	Cone (20–7)	Wade (1–1)		41,150	63-98
162	September 27	@ Yankees	8 – 3	Bruske (4–0)	White (2–6)		49,608	63-99

== Awards and honors ==
1998 MLB All-Star Game selection:

- Rolando Arrojo, pitcher

=== Team leaders ===
- Home runs – Fred McGriff (19)
- Runs batted in – Fred McGriff (81)
- Batting average – Aaron Ledesma (.324)
- Hits – Quinton McCracken (179)
- Stolen bases – Randy Winn (26)
- Walks – Fred McGriff (79)
- Wins – Rolando Arrojo (14)
- Strikeouts – Tony Saunders (172)
- Earned run average – Rolando Arrojo (starters) (3.56), Albie Lopez (relievers) (2.60)
- Saves – Roberto Hernández (26)

== Farm system ==
Level	Team	League	Manager
AAA	Durham Bulls	International League	Bill Evers
A	St. Petersburg Devil Rays	Florida State League	Roy Silver
A	Charleston RiverDogs	South Atlantic League	Greg Mahlberg
A-Short Season	Hudson Valley Renegades	New York–Penn League	Charlie Montoyo
Rookie	Princeton Devil Rays	Appalachian League	Dave Howard
Rookie	GCL Devil Rays	Gulf Coast League	Bobby Ramos
