= Tampa Bay Rays all-time roster =

List of baseball players

The following is a list of players, both past and current, who appeared in at least one game for the Tampa Bay Rays franchise, formerly known as the Devil Rays.

Players in Bold are members of the National Baseball Hall of Fame.

Players in Italics have had their numbers retired by the team.

== Alphabetical list ==
=== A ===
- (United States) Paul Abbott
- (United States) Brent Abernathy
- (Dominican Republic) Winston Abreu
- (United States) Garrett Acton
- (United States) Jason Adam
- (Dominican Republic) Willy Adames
- (Venezuela) Jesús Aguilar
- (United States) Scott Aldred
- (United States) Tyler Alexander
- (United States) Brandon Allen
- (Venezuela) José Alvarado
- (Venezuela) Wilson Álvarez
- (United States) Chase Anderson
- (United States) Marlon Anderson
- (United States) Nick Anderson
- (United States) Matt Andriese
- (Mexico) Jonathan Aranda
- (United States) Chris Archer
- (Venezuela) Oswaldo Arcia
- (United States) J.P. Arencibia
- (United States) Shawn Armstrong
- (Mexico) Randy Arozarena
- (Cuba) Rolando Arrojo
- (United States) Christian Arroyo
- (Dominican Republic) Willy Aybar

=== B ===
- (United States) Brandon Backe
- (Cuba) Danys Báez
- (United States) Burke Badenhop
- (United States) Bryan Baker
- (United States) Rocco Baldelli
- (Australia) Grant Balfour
- (United States) Anthony Banda
- (United States) Luke Bard
- (United States) Jason Bartlett
- (Venezuela) Osleivis Basabe
- (United States) Jake Bauers
- (Dominican Republic) José Bautista
- (United States) Shane Baz
- (United States) Tim Beckham
- (Canada) Érik Bédard
- (United States) Jalen Beeks
- (United States) Joe Beimel
- (Venezuela) Ronald Belisario
- (United States) Jeff Beliveau
- (United States) Andrew Bellatti
- (United States) Heath Bell
- (United States) Rob Bell
- (United States) Vince Belnome
- (United States) Anthony Bemboom
- (United States) Jeff Bennett
- (Dominican Republic) Joaquín Benoit
- (Panama) Christian Bethancourt
- (United States) Nick Bierbrodt
- (United States) Hunter Bigge
- (United States) Kurt Birkins
- (United States) Hank Blalock
- (United States) Geoff Blum
- (United States) **Wade Boggs**
- (United States) Joe Borowski
- (United States) Jason Bourgeois
- (United States) Peter Bourjos
- (United States) Brad Boxberger
- (United States) Joe Boyle
- (United States) Chad Bradford
- (United States) Taj Bradley
- (United States) Rob Brantly
- (United States) Russell Branyan
- (United States) Dewon Brazelton
- (United States) Ryan Brett
- (United States) Reid Brignac
- (United States) Braden Bristo
- (United States) Mike Brosseau
- (Dominican Republic) Vidal Bruján
- (United States) Jay Buente
- (United States) Zack Burdi
- (United States) Pat Burrell
- (United States) Sean Burroughs
- (United States) Joey Butler
- (Canada) Rich Butler

=== C ===
- (Panama) José Caballero
- (Venezuela) Asdrubal Cabrera
- (Venezuela) Miguel Cairo
- (United States) Mickey Callaway
- (Dominican Republic) Junior Caminero
- (United States) Shawn Camp
- (United States) Andy Cannizaro
- (Cuba) José Canseco
- (United States) Jorge Cantú
- (United States) Russ Canzler
- (United States) Dan Carlson
- (United States) Dylan Carlson
- (United States) Lance Carter
- (United States) Curt Casali
- (Puerto Rico) Raul Casanova
- (United States) Kevin Cash
- (Mexico) Vinny Castilla
- (Dominican Republic) Diego Castillo
- (Puerto Rico) Xavier Cedeño
- (Taiwan) Yu Chang
- (United States) J. T. Chargois
- (United States) Norm Charlton
- (United States) Jason Childers
- (Venezuela) Robinson Chirinos
- (Venezuela) Yonny Chirinos
- (United States) Randy Choate
- (South Korea) Ji-man Choi
- (United States) Steve Cishek
- (United States) Nick Ciuffo
- (United States) Aaron Civale
- (United States) Garrett Cleavinger
- (United States) Danny Clyburn
- (United States) Alex Cobb
- (Dominican Republic) Álex Colomé
- (Dominican Republic) Jesús Colomé
- (United States) Hank Conger
- (United States) Brooks Conrad
- (United States) Jason Conti
- (United States) Adam Conley
- (United States) Tim Corcoran
- (United States) Lance Cormier
- (United States) Fernando Cortez
- (United States) Steve Cox
- (United States) Carl Crawford
- (United States) Doug Creek
- (United States) Cooper Criswell
- (United States) C. J. Cron
- (Puerto Rico) José Cruz Jr.
- (Dominican Republic) Juan Cruz
- (Dominican Republic) Nelson Cruz
- (United States Virgin Islands) Midre Cummings
- (United States) John Curtiss

=== D ===
- (United States) Johnny Damon
- (United States) Travis d'Arnaud
- (United States) Johnny Davis
- (United States) Wade Davis
- (United States) Dane De La Rosa
- (Puerto Rico) José De León
- (United States) Jaff Decker
- (United States) David DeJesus
- (United States) Rob Delaney
- (Dominican Republic) Luis de los Santos
- (United States) Jonny DeLuca
- (United States) Chris Devenski
- (United States) Matt Diaz
- (Dominican Republic) Jumbo Díaz
- (Cuba) Yandy Díaz
- (United States) Corey Dickerson
- (United States) Jake Diekman
- (United States) Mike DiFelice
- (United States) Joe Dillon
- (United States) Scott Dohmann
- (Dominican Republic) José Domínguez
- (United States) Oliver Drake
- (United States) Logan Driscoll
- (United States) Lucas Duda
- (United States) Matt Duffy
- (United States) Robert Dugger
- (United States) Elijah Dukes
- (United States) Shelley Duncan
- (United States) Scott Dunn
- (United States) Mike Duvall
- (United States) Allan Dykstra

=== E ===
- (United States) Damion Easley
- (United States) Zach Eflin
- (United States) Dave Eiland
- (United States) Mike Ekstrom
- (United States) Chris Ellis
- (United States) Jake Elmore
- (United States) Trevor Enders
- (United States) Mason Englert
- (United States) Dietrich Enns
- (United States) Nathan Eovaldi
- (Venezuela) Félix Escalona
- (Cuba) Yunel Escobar
- (United States) Danny Espinosa
- (United States) Dana Eveland

=== F ===
- (United States) Pete Fairbanks
- (United States) Jake Faria
- (United States) Kyle Farnsworth
- (United States) Danny Farquhar
- (United States) Calvin Faucher
- (United States) Taylor Featherston
- (United States) Hunter Feduccia
- (United States) J. P. Feyereisen
- (United States) Robert Fick
- (United States) Johnny Field
- (United States) Cole Figueroa
- (United States) Tony Fiore
- (United States) John Flaherty
- (United States) Josh Fleming
- (United States) Dylan Floro
- (United States) Cliff Floyd
- (Venezuela) Wilmer Font
- (United States) Brook Fordyce
- (United States) Logan Forsythe
- (United States) Nick Fortes
- (Dominican Republic) Bartolomé Fortunato
- (United States) Casey Fossum
- (United States) Ben Francisco
- (Dominican Republic) Julio Franco
- (Dominican Republic) Wander Franco
- (United States) Nick Franklin
- (United States) Jake Fraley
- (Colombia) Ernesto Frieri
- (United States) Sam Fuld

=== G ===
- (United States) Eddie Gaillard
- (United States) Eddie Gamboa
- (Venezuela) Avisaíl García
- (Dominican Republic) Édgar García
- (United States) Lee Gardner
- (United States) Ryan Garton
- (United States) Matt Garza
- (United States) Ralph Garza
- (United States) Joey Gathright
- (United States) Chad Gaudin
- (United States) Steve Geltz
- (United States) Joey Gerber
- (United States) Paul Gervase
- (United States) Ian Gibaut
- (United States) Sean Gilmartin
- (United States) Chris Gimenez
- (United States) Tyler Glasnow
- (United States) Gary Glover
- (United States) Charles Gipson
- (United States) Brandon Gomes
- (United States) Jonny Gomes
- (Dominican Republic) Carlos Gómez
- (United States) Chris Gomez
- (Venezuela) Yoendrys Gómez
- (United States) Alex Gonzalez
- (Puerto Rico) Dicky Gonzalez
- (Venezuela) Geremi González
- (United States) Dwight Gooden
- (United States) Niko Goodrum
- (United States) Rick Gorecki
- (United States) Tony Graffanino
- (United States) Tristan Gray
- (United States) Nick Green
- (United States) Ben Grieve
- (United States) Gabe Gross
- (Panama) Javy Guerra
- (Dominican Republic) José Guillén
- (Venezuela) Ozzie Guillén
- (United States) Preston Guilmet
- (United States) Mark Guthrie
- (United States) Brandon Guyer
- (Dominican Republic) Freddy Guzmán
- (Dominican Republic) Joel Guzmán
- (Dominican Republic) Juan Guzmán

=== H ===
- (United States) John Halama
- (United States) Toby Hall
- (United States) Jason Hammel
- (United States) Ryan Hanigan
- (United States) Travis Harper
- (United States) Brendan Harris
- (United States) Chad Harville
- (United States) Brad Hawpe
- (United States) Nathan Haynes
- (United States) Louis Head
- (Cuba) Adeiny Hechavarria
- (United States) Jeremy Hellickson
- (United States) Heath Hembree
- (United States) Mark Hendrickson
- (Cuba) Guillermo Heredia
- (United States) Kevin Herget
- (Cuba) Michel Hernández
- (Puerto Rico) Roberto Hernández
- (Dominican Republic) Roberto Hernández
- (United States) David Hess
- (Canada) Liam Hicks
- (United States) Ken Hill
- (United States) Rich Hill
- (United States) Eric Hinske
- (United States) Damon Hollins
- (United States) Brent Honeywell Jr.
- (United States) Paul Hoover
- (United States) Brody Hopkins
- (United States) Adrian Houser
- (United States) J. P. Howell
- (Taiwan) Chih-Wei Hu
- (United States) Aubrey Huff
- (United States) Tommy Hunter

=== I ===
- (United States) Jason Isringhausen
- (Japan) Akinori Iwamura

=== J ===
- (United States) Alex Jackson
- (United States) Edwin Jackson
- (United States) Delvin James
- (United States) Travis Jankowski
- (United States) Danny Jansen
- (United States) John Jaso
- (United States) Griffin Jax
- (United States) Dan Jennings
- (United States) Desmond Jennings
- (United States) Kevin Jepsen
- (United States) Jason Jiménez
- (United States) Charles Johnson
- (United States) Dan Johnson
- (United States) DJ Johnson
- (United States) Elliot Johnson
- (United States) Jason Johnson
- (United States) Kelly Johnson
- (United States) Russ Johnson
- (United States) Matt Joyce
- (United States) Mike Judd

=== K ===
- (United States) Gabe Kapler
- (United States) Nate Karns
- (United States) Scott Kazmir
- (United States) Kenny Kelly
- (United States) Kevin Kelly
- (United States) Mike Kelly
- (United States) Trevor Kelley
- (United States) Joe Kennedy
- (United States) Steve Kent
- (United States) Jeff Keppinger
- (United States) Kevin Kiermaier
- (South Korea) Ha-Seong Kim
- (United States) Andrew Kittredge
- (United States) Corey Kluber
- (United States) Dusten Knight
- (United States) Adam Kolarek
- (United States) Casey Kotchman
- (United States) Erik Kratz
- (United States) Marc Krauss
- (United States) Joey Krehbiel
- (United States) Joel Kuhnel

=== L ===
- (United States) Joe La Sorsa
- (Canada) Pete Laforest
- (United States) Tim Laker
- (United States) David Lamb
- (United States) Aaron Ledesma
- (United States) Travis Lee
- (United States) Casey Legumina
- (United States) Al Levine
- (United States) Cory Lidle
- (United States) Jeff Liefer
- (United States) Zack Littell
- (Venezuela) José Lobatón
- (United States) George Lombard
- (United States) James Loney
- (United States) Evan Longoria
- (United States) Albie López
- (Puerto Rico) Felipe López
- (United States) Jacob Lopez
- (Dominican Republic) José López
- (United States) Aaron Loup
- (United States) Richard Lovelady
- (United States) Brandon Lowe
- (United States) Josh Lowe
- (United States) Nathaniel Lowe
- (United States) Terrell Lowery
- (United States) Josh Lueke
- (Dominican Republic) Julio Lugo
- (Dominican Republic) Ruddy Lugo
- (United States) Jordan Luplow

=== M ===
- (United States) Mikie Mahtook
- (United States) Luke Maile
- (United States) Mark Malaska
- (United States) Jake Mangum
- (Dominican Republic) Manuel Margot
- (Dominican Republic) Jhan Mariñez
- (United States) Al Martin
- (United States) Tom Martin
- (United States) Trevor Martin
- (United States) Dave Martinez
- (Dominican Republic) Félix Martínez
- (Venezuela) José Martínez
- (Dominican Republic) Michael Martínez
- (United States) Tino Martinez
- (United States) Justin Marks
- (United States) Miles Mastrobuoni
- (United States) Phil Maton
- (Japan) Hideki Matsui
- (United States) Steven Matz
- (United States) Chris Mazza
- (United States) David McCarty
- (United States) Scott McClain
- (United States) Shane McClanahan
- (United States) Seth McClung
- (United States) Quinton McCracken
- (United States) Easton McGee
- (United States) Jake McGee
- (United States) **Fred McGriff**
- (United States) Collin McHugh
- (United States) Brendan McKay
- (United States) David McKay
- (United States) Rusty Meacham
- (Australia) Curtis Mead
- (United States) Austin Meadows
- (United States) Brian Meadows
- (United States) Jim Mecir
- (Dominican Republic) Francisco Mejia
- (United States) Dan Miceli
- (United States) Brad Miller
- (United States) Trever Miller
- (United States) Hoby Milner
- (United States) Kameron Misner
- (United States) Dustan Mohr
- (Puerto Rico) José Molina
- (United States) Coco Montes
- (United States) Mason Montgomery
- (United States) Adam Moore
- (United States) Matt Moore
- (Dominican Republic) Christopher Morel
- (Venezuela) Diego Moreno
- (United States) Jim Morris
- (United States) Logan Morrison
- (United States) Charlie Morton
- (Australia) Damian Moss
- (United States) Taylor Motter
- (United States) Cedric Mullins
- (United States) Eric Munson
- (United States) Wil Myers

=== N ===
- (United States) Daniel Nava
- (Venezuela) Dioner Navarro
- (United States) Joe Nelson
- (United States) Alan Newman
- (United States) Jeff Niemann
- (Japan) Hideo Nomo
- (United States) Derek Norris
- (United States) Greg Norton
- (Dominican Republic) Franklin Núñez
- (United States) Vidal Nuño

=== O ===
- (United States) Joseph Odom
- (United States) Jake Odorizzi
- (Dominican Republic) Cristofer Ogando
- (United States) Brian O'Grady
- (Venezuela) Luis Ordaz
- (Cuba) Rey Ordóñez
- (United States) Chad Orvella
- (United States) Eric Orze
- (Dominican Republic) Juan Carlos Oviedo

=== P ===
- (United States) Kevin Padlo
- (United States) Emilio Pagán
- (United States) Richie Palacios
- (Mexico) Isaac Paredes
- (United States) Jim Parque
- (United States) Steve Parris
- (Colombia) Luis Patiño
- (United States) Josh Paul
- (United States) Steve Pearce
- (Dominican Republic) Carlos Peña
- (United States) Brad Pennington
- (United States) Ryan Pepiot
- (Venezuela) David Peralta
- (Dominican Republic) Joel Peralta
- (United States) Troy Percival
- (Venezuela) Everson Pereira
- (Dominican Republic) Antonio Pérez
- (United States) Eduardo Pérez
- (United States) Fernando Perez
- (Dominican Republic) Héctor Pérez
- (Puerto Rico) Michael Pérez
- (Venezuela) Tomás Pérez
- (United States) Herb Perry
- (Canada) Tristan Peters
- (United States) Shane Peterson
- (United States) Tommy Pham
- (United States) Josh Phelps
- (United States) Travis Phelps
- (United States) Brett Phillips
- (United States) Evan Phillips
- (United States) Adam Piatt
- (Venezuela) René Pinto
- (Venezuela) Ricardo Pinto
- (United States) Kenny Piper
- (United States) Trevor Plouffe
- (United States) Colin Poche
- (United States) Sean Poppen
- (United States) David Price
- (Cuba) Ariel Prieto
- (United States) Austin Pruitt
- (Dominican Republic) César Puello

=== Q ===
- (United States) Chad Qualls
- (Venezuela) Juniel Querecuto
- (United States) Roman Quinn

=== R ===
- (United States) Brooks Raley
- (United States) Luke Raley
- (Cuba) Alexei Ramírez
- (Nicaragua) Erasmo Ramírez
- (Colombia) Harold Ramirez
- (Dominican Republic) Manny Ramirez
- (United States) Cesar Ramos
- (Venezuela) Wilson Ramos
- (United States) Colby Rasmus
- (United States) Drew Rasmussen
- (United States) Cody Reed
- (South Korea) Rob Refsnyder
- (United States) Bryan Rekar
- (United States) Hunter Renfroe
- (Dominican Republic) Al Reyes
- (United States) Carlos Reyes
- (United States) Will Rhymes
- (United States) Chris Richard
- (United States) Trevor Richards
- (United States) Jeff Ridgway
- (United States) C.J. Riefenhauser
- (United States) Shawn Riggans
- (United States) Todd Ritchie
- (Puerto Rico) René Rivera
- (United States) Ryan Roberts
- (United States) Daniel Robertson
- (United States) David Robertson
- (United States) Kerry Robinson
- (United States) Joe Rock
- (United States) John Rocker
- (Dominican Republic) Fernando Rodney
- (Dominican Republic) Elvin Rodríguez
- (Mexico) Manuel Rodríguez
- (United States) Sean Rodriguez
- (United States) Chaz Roe
- (United States) Damian Rolls
- (United States) Jason Romano
- (Dominican Republic) Enny Romero
- (United States) Tommy Romero
- (United States) Sergio Romo
- (United States) Ben Rortvedt
- (Dominican Republic) Amed Rosario
- (United States) Brian Rose
- (United States) Matt Ruebel
- (United States) Justin Ruggiano
- (United States) Ryan Rupe
- (United States) Adam Russell
- (South Korea) Jae Kuk Ryu

=== S ===
- (United States) Casey Sadler
- (Dominican Republic) Juan Salas
- (Cuba) Alex Sánchez
- (Puerto Rico) Rey Sánchez
- (United States) Jared Sandberg
- (United States) Phoenix Sanders
- (United States) Jerry Sands
- (Dominican Republic) Julio Santana
- (United States) Tony Saunders
- (United States) Jesse Scholtens
- (United States) Jaime Schultz
- (United States) Luke Scott
- (United States) Connor Seabold
- (United States) Bobby Seay
- (South Korea) Jae Weong Seo
- (United States) Bob Seymour
- (United States) Ian Seymour
- (United States) Richie Shaffer
- (United States) Andy Sheets
- (United States) Austin Shenton
- (United States) Ryan Sherriff
- (United States) James Shields
- (United States) Kelly Shoppach
- (United States) Brian Shouse
- (United States) Terry Shumpert
- (United States) Dave Silvestri
- (Netherlands Antilles) Randall Simon
- (United States) Chandler Simpson
- (United States) Chris Singleton
- (Dominican Republic) Jose Siri
- (United States) Grady Sizemore
- (United States) Aaron Slegers
- (United States) Bob Smith
- (United States) Jason Smith
- (United States) Kevan Smith
- (United States) Mallex Smith
- (United States) Drew Smyly
- (United States) Blake Snell
- (United States) Brandon Snyder
- (United States) Eric Sogard
- (United States) Chase Solesky
- (Mexico) Alí Solís
- (United States) Andy Sonnanstine
- (Dominican Republic) Rafael Soriano
- (United States) Paul Sorrento
- (Dominican Republic) Jorge Sosa
- (United States) Steven Souza Jr.
- (United States) Denard Span
- (United States) Jeff Sparks
- (United States) Dennis Springer
- (United States) Russ Springer
- (United States) Jeffrey Springs
- (United States) Jason Standridge
- (United States) Ryne Stanek
- (United States) Robert Stephenson
- (United States) Kevin Stocker
- (United States) Brian Stokes
- (United States) Justin Sterner
- (United States) Hunter Strickland
- (United States) Tyler Sturdevant
- (United States) Tanyon Sturtze
- (Venezuela) Jesús Sucre
- (United States) Cole Sulser
- (United States) Drew Sutton
- (United States) Jon Switzer

=== T ===
- (United States) Mitch Talbot
- (Dominican Republic) Raimel Tapia
- (Dominican Republic) Ramón Tatís
- (United States) Billy Taylor
- (United States) Reggie Taylor
- (United States) Everett Teaford
- (United States) Matt Thaiss
- (United States) Dale Thayer
- (United States) Rich Thompson
- (United States) Ryan Thompson
- (United States) Ozzie Timmons
- (Venezuela) Alexander Torres
- (United States) Steve Trachsel
- (United States) Bubba Trammell
- (United States) Chris Truby
- (Japan) Yoshi Tsutsugo
- (United States) Jason Tyner

=== U ===
- (Dominican Republic) Edwin Uceta
- (United States) B. J. Upton

=== V ===
- (Puerto Rico) Javier Valentín
- (United States) Brian Van Belle
- (United States) Greg Vaughn
- (Venezuela) Jorge Velandia
- (United States) Andrew Velazquez
- (United States) Mike Venafro
- (United States) Jonny Venters
- (United States) Ryan Vilade
- (United States) Stephen Vogt

=== W ===
- (United States) Michael Wacha
- (United States) Terrell Wade
- (United States) Doug Waechter
- (United States) Jacob Waguespack
- (United States) Tyler Walker
- (United States) Jeff Wallace
- (United States) Taylor Walls
- (United States) Jerome Walton
- (United States) John Webb
- (United States) Ryan Webb
- (United States) Ryan Weber
- (United States) Rickie Weeks Jr.
- (United States) Joey Wendle
- (United States) Dan Wheeler
- (United States) Rick White
- (United States) Chase Whitley
- (United States) Forrest Whitley
- (United States) Cole Wilcox
- (United States) Ty Wigginton
- (United States) Carson Williams
- (United States) Gerald Williams
- (United States) Justin Williams
- (United States) Ben Williamson
- (United States) Bobby Wilson
- (United States) Josh Wilson
- (United States) Paul Wilson
- (United States) Randy Winn
- (United States) Matt Wisler
- (United States) Jay Witasick
- (United States) Bobby Witt
- (United States) Kevin Witt
- (United States) Kean Wong
- (United States) Hunter Wood
- (United States) Jamey Wright
- (United States) Wesley Wright

=== Y ===
- (United States) Jimmy Yacabonis
- (Dominican Republic) Esteban Yan
- (United States) Ryan Yarbrough
- (United States) Kirby Yates
- (United States) Delmon Young

=== Z ===
- (Venezuela) Víctor Zambrano
- (United States) Gregg Zaun
- (United States) Ben Zobrist
- (United States) Tyler Zuber
- (United States) Mike Zunino

== Nationality breakdown ==
- 462 United States
- 55 Dominican Republic
- 30 Venezuela
- 12 Cuba
- 12 Puerto Rico
- 5 Mexico
- 4 Japan
- 4 South Korea
- 3 Australia
- 4 Canada
- 3 Colombia
- 3 Panama
- 2 Taiwan
- 1 Netherlands Antilles
- 1 Nicaragua
- 1 (United States Virgin Islands) U.S. Virgin Islands
