= 1997 Major League Baseball expansion draft =

Selection of players by the Rays and Diamondbacks

- The logo for the 1997 MLB expansion draft

General information
- Sport: Baseball
- Date: November 18, 1997
- Location: Phoenix Civic Plaza, Phoenix, Arizona
- Network: ESPN (Note: The first two hours of the draft were broadcast on ESPN, followed by four hours on ESPN2.)

Overview
- 70 total selections
- League: Major League Baseball (Note: While the National League and American League are commonly referred to collectively as Major League Baseball, across many decades, Major League Baseball has only existed as a legal entity since 2000.)
- Expansion teams: Arizona Diamondbacks; Tampa Bay Devil Rays
- Expansion season: 1998
- First selection: Tony Saunders (Tampa Bay Devil Rays)

The 1997 Major League Baseball expansion draft was held on November 18, 1997, at the Phoenix Civic Plaza in Phoenix, Arizona. The expansion draft allowed two expansion teams in Major League Baseball (MLB)—the Arizona Diamondbacks and the Tampa Bay Devil Rays (Note: The Tampa Bay Devil Rays were renamed as the Tampa Bay Rays prior to the 2008 season.)—to build their rosters prior to their inaugural seasons.

Both teams subsequently began play in the 1998 season, increasing the size of the National League from 14 to 16 teams (Milwaukee switched to the National League to ensure an even number of teams remained in each league). Arizona was placed in the National League West division and Tampa Bay was played in the American League East division. This remains the most recent expansion draft conducted by MLB.

== Background ==
1998 MLB Expansion Teams

Following the success of the 1993 expansion, which added the Colorado Rockies and Florida Marlins, Major League Baseball (MLB) in 1994 set up an expansion committee to add two expansion teams. The Tampa Bay area in Florida and the city of Phoenix, Arizona, were chosen for the two expansion franchises.

== Procedures ==
Similar to the 1992 expansion draft, both expansion teams selected 35 players. The draft was divided into three rounds. Each team would select 14 players in round 1, 14 players in round 2, and 7 players in round 3. Tampa Bay general manager Chuck LaMar and Arizona general manager Joe Garagiola Jr. oversaw their teams' selections.

The Devil Rays and Diamondbacks could pick any player not on the protected lists of the 28 other teams, although no team could lose more than one player in a given round. The protected list for each team consisted of:

- For the first round, 15 players from the rosters of their entire organization—both their 40-man roster, plus all minor league affiliates.
- Each team could add three more players to its protected list after each round.
- All players in an organization were eligible to be drafted, except those with no prior major league experience who had less than three years service if signed at age 19 or older, or had less than four years of service if signed at age 18 or younger.
- Players who were free agents after the end of the 1997 season need not be protected.

As with the 1992 expansion draft, the order was determined by a coin toss. The winner of the toss could choose either: (a) The first overall pick in the expansion draft or (b) allow the other team to pick first and receive both the second and third overall expansion draft picks and the right to pick first in the subsequent rounds of the expansion draft. Arizona won the toss and chose to select second.

== Results ==
The Devil Rays reportedly considered trading the player they were to select first. They chose Tony Saunders from the Florida Marlins.

Key
‡	All-Star

Note, each noted All-Star player achieved that status in later season(s).

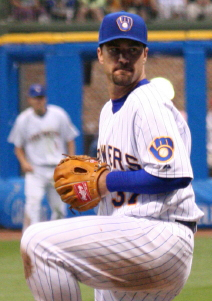
Jeff Suppan was the 2006 NLCS MVP.

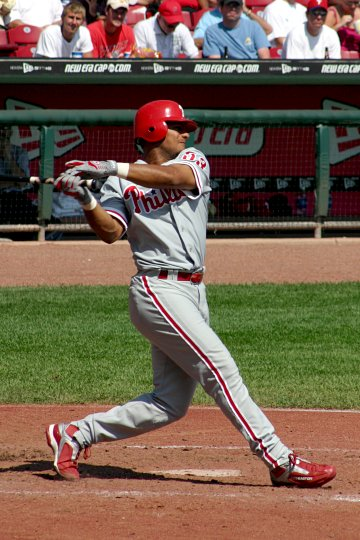
The Rays traded Bobby Abreu prior to the season for Kevin Stocker.

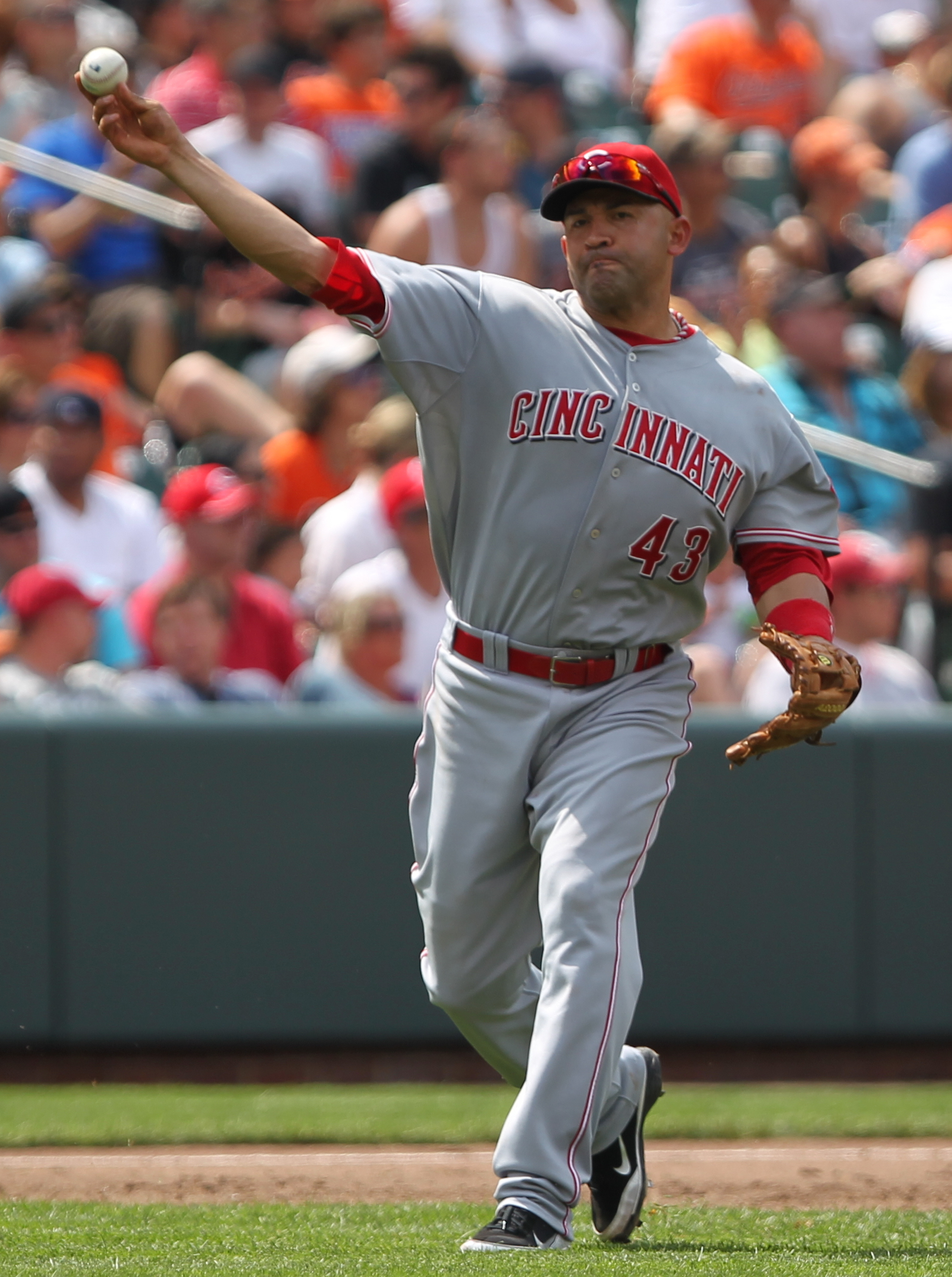
Miguel Cairo has played for 10 different Major League teams at 7 different positions (counting DH).

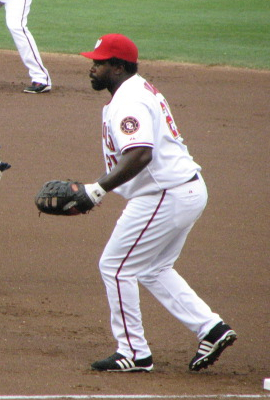
Dmitri Young was selected by the Devil Rays from the Reds, and then traded back to the Reds.

Round	Pick	Player	Position	From	To
1	1	Tony Saunders	Left-handed pitcher	Florida Marlins	Tampa Bay Devil Rays
1	2	Brian Anderson	Left-handed pitcher	Cleveland Indians	Arizona Diamondbacks
1	3	Jeff Suppan	Right-handed pitcher	Boston Red Sox	Arizona Diamondbacks
1	4	Quinton McCracken	Outfielder	Colorado Rockies	Tampa Bay Devil Rays
1	5	Gabe Alvarez	Third baseman	San Diego Padres	Arizona Diamondbacks
1	6	Bobby Abreu^{‡}	Outfielder	Houston Astros	Tampa Bay Devil Rays
1	7	Jorge Fábregas	Catcher	Chicago White Sox	Arizona Diamondbacks
1	8	Miguel Cairo	Second baseman	Chicago Cubs	Tampa Bay Devil Rays
1	9	Karim García	Outfielder	Los Angeles Dodgers	Arizona Diamondbacks
1	10	Rich Butler	Outfielder	Toronto Blue Jays	Tampa Bay Devil Rays
1	11	Edwin Díaz	Infielder	Texas Rangers	Arizona Diamondbacks
1	12	Bob Smith	Third baseman	Atlanta Braves	Tampa Bay Devil Rays
1	13	Cory Lidle	Right-handed pitcher	New York Mets	Arizona Diamondbacks
1	14	Jason Johnson	Right-handed pitcher	Pittsburgh Pirates	Tampa Bay Devil Rays
1	15	Joel Adamson	Left-handed pitcher	Milwaukee Brewers	Arizona Diamondbacks
1	16	Dmitri Young^{‡}	First baseman	Cincinnati Reds	Tampa Bay Devil Rays
1	17	Ben Ford	Right-handed pitcher	New York Yankees	Arizona Diamondbacks
1	18	Esteban Yan	Right-handed pitcher	Baltimore Orioles	Tampa Bay Devil Rays
1	19	Yamil Benitez	Outfielder	Kansas City Royals	Arizona Diamondbacks
1	20	Mike DiFelice	Catcher	St. Louis Cardinals	Tampa Bay Devil Rays
1	21	Neil Weber	Left-handed pitcher	Montreal Expos	Arizona Diamondbacks
1	22	Bubba Trammell	Outfielder	Detroit Tigers	Tampa Bay Devil Rays
1	23	Jason Boyd	Right-handed pitcher	Philadelphia Phillies	Arizona Diamondbacks
1	24	Andy Sheets	Infielder	Seattle Mariners	Tampa Bay Devil Rays
1	25	Brent Brede	Outfielder	Minnesota Twins	Arizona Diamondbacks
1	26	Dennis Springer	Right-handed pitcher	Anaheim Angels	Tampa Bay Devil Rays
1	27	Tony Batista^{‡}	Infielder	Oakland Athletics	Arizona Diamondbacks
1	28	Dan Carlson	Right-handed pitcher	San Francisco Giants	Tampa Bay Devil Rays
2	29	Tom Martin	Left-handed pitcher	Houston Astros	Arizona Diamondbacks
2	30	Brian Boehringer	Right-handed pitcher	New York Yankees	Tampa Bay Devil Rays
2	31	Omar Daal	Left-handed pitcher	Toronto Blue Jays	Arizona Diamondbacks
2	32	Mike Duvall	Left-handed pitcher	Florida Marlins	Tampa Bay Devil Rays
2	33	Scott Winchester	Right-handed pitcher	Cincinnati Reds	Arizona Diamondbacks
2	34	John LeRoy	Right-handed pitcher	Atlanta Braves	Tampa Bay Devil Rays
2	35	Clint Sodowsky	Right-handed pitcher	Pittsburgh Pirates	Arizona Diamondbacks
2	36	Jim Mecir	Right-handed pitcher	Boston Red Sox	Tampa Bay Devil Rays
2	37	Danny Klassen	Infielder	Milwaukee Brewers	Arizona Diamondbacks
2	38	Bryan Rekar	Right-handed pitcher	Colorado Rockies	Tampa Bay Devil Rays
2	39	Matt Drews	Right-handed pitcher	Detroit Tigers	Arizona Diamondbacks
2	40	Rick Gorecki	Right-handed pitcher	Los Angeles Dodgers	Tampa Bay Devil Rays
2	41	Todd Erdos	Right-handed pitcher	San Diego Padres	Arizona Diamondbacks
2	42	Ramón Tatís	Left-handed pitcher	Chicago Cubs	Tampa Bay Devil Rays
2	43	Chris Clemons	Right-handed pitcher	Chicago White Sox	Arizona Diamondbacks
2	44	Kerry Robinson	Outfielder	St. Louis Cardinals	Tampa Bay Devil Rays
2	45	David Dellucci	Outfielder	Baltimore Orioles	Arizona Diamondbacks
2	46	Steve Cox	First baseman	Oakland Athletics	Tampa Bay Devil Rays
2	47	Damian Miller^{‡}	Catcher	Minnesota Twins	Arizona Diamondbacks
2	48	Albie Lopez	Right-handed pitcher	Cleveland Indians	Tampa Bay Devil Rays
2	49	Héctor Carrasco	Right-handed pitcher	Kansas City Royals	Arizona Diamondbacks
2	50	José Paniagua	Right-handed pitcher	Montreal Expos	Tampa Bay Devil Rays
2	51	Hanley Frias	Shortstop	Texas Rangers	Arizona Diamondbacks
2	52	Carlos Mendoza	Outfielder	New York Mets	Tampa Bay Devil Rays
2	53	Bob Wolcott	Right-handed pitcher	Seattle Mariners	Arizona Diamondbacks
2	54	Ryan Karp	Left-handed pitcher	Philadelphia Phillies	Tampa Bay Devil Rays
2	55	Mike Bell	Third baseman	Anaheim Angels	Arizona Diamondbacks
2	56	Santos Hernández	Right-handed pitcher	San Francisco Giants	Tampa Bay Devil Rays
3	57	Joe Randa	Third baseman	Pittsburgh Pirates	Arizona Diamondbacks
3	58	Randy Winn^{‡}	Outfielder	Florida Marlins	Tampa Bay Devil Rays
3	59	Jesús Martínez	Left-handed pitcher	Los Angeles Dodgers	Arizona Diamondbacks
3	60	Terrell Wade	Left-handed pitcher	Atlanta Braves	Tampa Bay Devil Rays
3	61	Russ Springer	Right-handed pitcher	Houston Astros	Arizona Diamondbacks
3	62	Aaron Ledesma	Infielder	Baltimore Orioles	Tampa Bay Devil Rays
3	63	Bryan Corey	Right-handed pitcher	Detroit Tigers	Arizona Diamondbacks
3	64	Brooks Kieschnick	Outfielder	Chicago Cubs	Tampa Bay Devil Rays
3	65	Kelly Stinnett	Catcher	Milwaukee Brewers	Arizona Diamondbacks
3	66	Luke Wilcox	Outfielder	New York Yankees	Tampa Bay Devil Rays
3	67	Chuck McElroy	Left-handed pitcher	Chicago White Sox	Arizona Diamondbacks
3	68	Herbert Perry	Infielder	Cleveland Indians	Tampa Bay Devil Rays
3	69	Marty Janzen	Right-handed pitcher	Toronto Blue Jays	Arizona Diamondbacks
3	70	Vaughn Eshelman	Left-handed pitcher	Oakland Athletics	Tampa Bay Devil Rays

== Post-draft trades ==
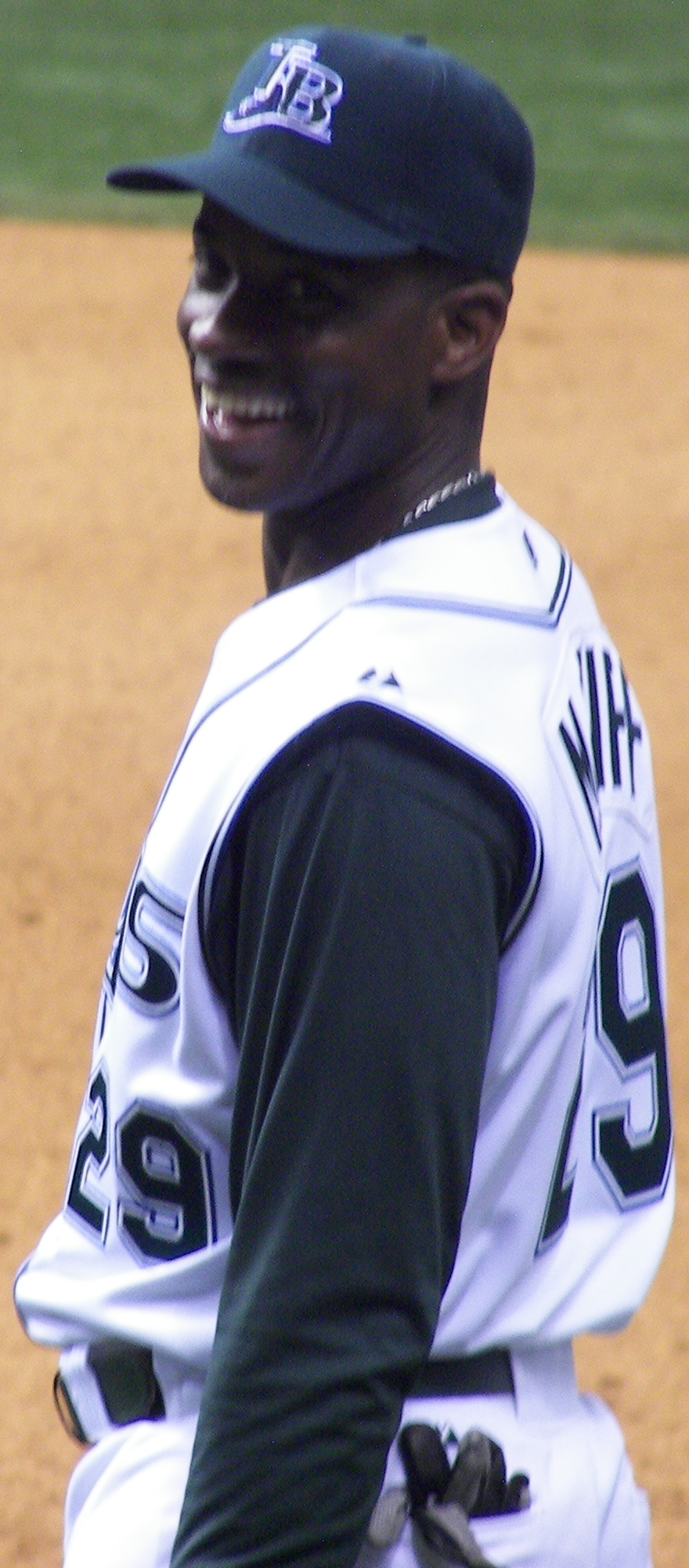
The Rays purchased Tampa native Fred McGriff from the Atlanta Braves after the draft.

Once the draft was completed a number of trades were made. Teams had to wait until after the draft or risk losing their newly acquired players because they were not on their protected lists.

- The Devil Rays traded Bobby Abreu to the Philadelphia Phillies for Kevin Stocker
- The Devil Rays traded Andy Sheets and Brian Boehringer to the San Diego Padres for John Flaherty
- The Devil Rays traded Dmitri Young to the Cincinnati Reds for Mike Kelly
- The Devil Rays purchased Fred McGriff from the Atlanta Braves
- The Diamondbacks traded Gabe Alvarez, Joe Randa, and Matt Drews to the Detroit Tigers for Travis Fryman
- The Diamondbacks traded Scott Winchester to the Cincinnati Reds for Félix Rodríguez
- The Diamondbacks traded Jesus Martinez to the Florida Marlins for Devon White
- The Diamondbacks traded Chuck McElroy to the Colorado Rockies for Harvey Pulliam

== Aftermath ==
The Diamondbacks intended to make their team competitive as soon as possible by signing free agents. The day prior to the expansion draft, they signed Jay Bell to a $34 million contract across five years. Two weeks following the draft, the Diamondbacks traded Fryman and Martin to the Indians for Matt Williams.

The Devil Rays and Diamondbacks had differing results in their first years in MLB. Both teams altered their initial plans of developing youth; the Devil Rays acquired future Hall of Famer Wade Boggs and pitcher Wilson Alvarez along with sluggers Jose Canseco, Vinny Castilla, and Greg Vaughn while the Diamondbacks added Randy Johnson, Curt Schilling, Luis Gonzalez, Todd Stottlemyre, Steve Finley, Armando Reynoso, Greg Swindell, Tony Womack, Mark Grace, Reggie Sanders, Craig Counsell and Greg Colbrunn.

While the Devil Rays consistently finished last in the AL East for the next decade, the Diamondbacks won the NL West title in 1999, 2001, and 2002, and won the 2001 World Series.
