= Mecir =

Mecir or Mečíř is a surname. Notable people with the surname include:

- Jim Mecir (born 1970), American baseball player
- Miloslav Mečíř (born 1964), Slovak tennis player
- Miloslav Mečíř Jr. (born 1988), Slovak tennis player
