= Tony Conigliaro Award =

Major League Baseball player award

Tony Conigliaro
- Tony Conigliaro, the namesake of the award
- Awarded for: Given annually to a Major League Baseball player who best overcomes an obstacle and adversity through the attributes of spirit, determination and courage that were trademarks of Conigliaro.
- Presented by: Boston chapter of the Baseball Writers' Association of America

History
- First award: 1990
- Most recent: Tim Hill, New York Yankees

The Tony Conigliaro Award is a national recognition instituted in 1990 by the Boston Red Sox of Major League Baseball (MLB) to honor the memory of Tony Conigliaro. It is given annually to the MLB player who best "overcomes an obstacle and adversity through the attributes of spirit, determination, and courage that were trademarks of Conigliaro."

Conigliaro debuted with the Red Sox in 1964, and was selected to the MLB All-Star Game in the 1967 season. Subsequently, he was hit in the face by a pitch at Fenway Park on August 18, 1967. After missing the rest of the year and all of 1968, he made a comeback in 1969, homering on opening day. He then hit 20 home runs in that season, winning The Sporting News Comeback Player of the Year Award. In 1970, he posted career highs in home runs with 36 and RBIs with 116, but vision problems continued to persist; his performance fell off, and he was never the same player. After a final comeback attempt in 1975, Conigliaro retired at age 30.

Conigliaro died in 1990, and the Red Sox instituted the award in his honor. A panel is composed of the media, representatives of the commissioner, and the two leagues' offices. The selection is made by a panel of voters and the award is presented at the annual dinner of the Boston chapter of the Baseball Writers' Association of America (BBWAA), normally held in December or January, by members of the Conigliaro family.

== Award winners ==
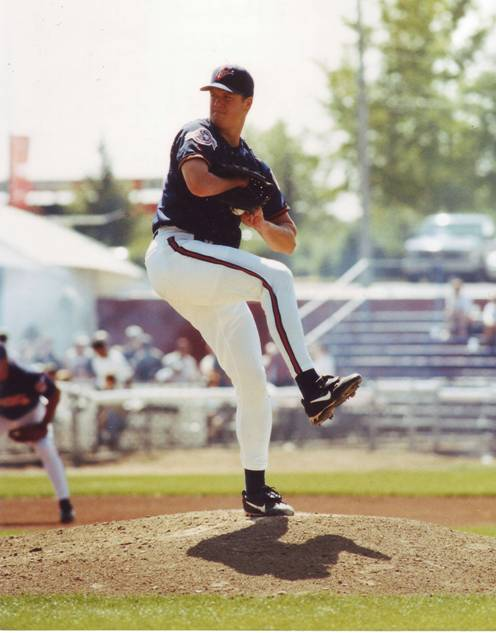
Jim Abbott learned how to pitch and use a glove with only one hand.

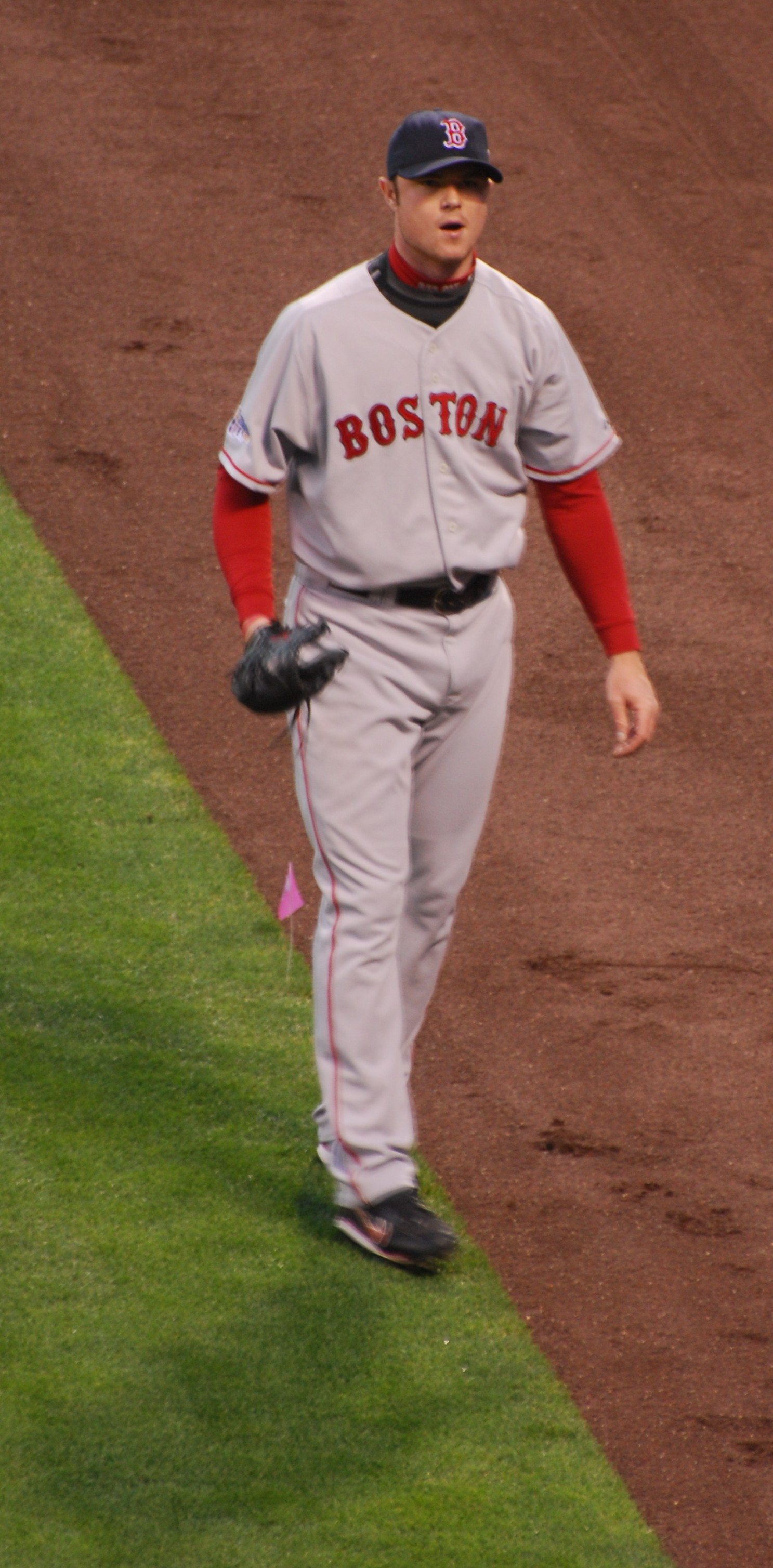
Jon Lester helped the Red Sox win the 2007 World Series, one year after undergoing treatment for cancer.

^	Indicates multiple award winners in the same year
‡	Denotes player who is still active

Year	Player	Team	Adversity overcome	Ref
1990	Jim Eisenreich	Kansas City Royals	Tourette syndrome	
1991	Dickie Thon	Philadelphia Phillies	A 1984 beaning very similar to the one that shortened Conigliaro's career	
1992	Jim Abbott	California Angels	Born without a right hand	
1993	Bo Jackson	Chicago White Sox	Hip replacement surgery in 1992	
1994	Mark Leiter	California Angels	Death of 9-month-old son to spinal muscular atrophy during the offseason	
1995	Scott Radinsky	Chicago White Sox	Diagnosed with Hodgkin's lymphoma	
1996	Curtis Pride	Montreal Expos	Born deaf	
1997	Eric Davis	Baltimore Orioles	Diagnosed with colon cancer early that season	
1998	Bret Saberhagen	Boston Red Sox	Serious shoulder injuries	
1999	Mike Lowell	Florida Marlins	Testicular cancer	
2000^{^}	Kent Mercker	Anaheim Angels	Cerebral hemorrhage	
2000^{^}	Tony Saunders	Tampa Bay Devil Rays	Broke arm while throwing a pitch	
2001^{^}	Graeme Lloyd	Montreal Expos	Arthroscopic shoulder surgery in 2000, and the death of his wife from Crohn's disease	
2001^{^}	Jason Johnson	Baltimore Orioles	Type 1 diabetes that required Johnson to wear an insulin pump on the field	
2002	José Rijo	Cincinnati Reds	Elbow injuries that required five surgeries and sidelined him for five years	
2003	Jim Mecir	Oakland Athletics	Born with two club feet	
2004	Dewon Brazelton	Tampa Bay Devil Rays	Reconstructive knee surgery and Tommy John surgery while in high school	
2005	Aaron Cook	Colorado Rockies	Blood clots in both lungs	
2006	Freddy Sanchez	Pittsburgh Pirates	Born with a club foot (right) and a severely pigeon-toed foot (left)	
2007	Jon Lester	Boston Red Sox	Diagnosed with Non-Hodgkin lymphoma in 2006	
2008	Rocco Baldelli	Tampa Bay Rays	Diagnosed with a mitochondrial disorder that causes chronic muscle fatigue	
2009	Chris Carpenter	St. Louis Cardinals	Had Tommy John surgery and nerve problems in his throwing arm	
2010	Joaquín Benoit	Tampa Bay Rays	Sat out a year after a rotator cuff tear	
2011	Tony Campana	Chicago Cubs	Diagnosed with Hodgkin's lymphoma as a child	
2012	R. A. Dickey	New York Mets	Victim of child sexual abuse, born without an ulnar collateral ligament in his right arm	
2013	John Lackey	Boston Red Sox	Underwent Tommy John surgery in 2012	
2014	Wilson Ramos	Washington Nationals	Kidnapped in 2011, multiple injuries including a torn anterior cruciate ligament, a broken hamate bone, and repeated hamstring strains	
2015	Mitch Harris	St. Louis Cardinals	Delayed baseball career five years while serving in the United States Navy; first Naval Academy graduate to make MLB debut since 1921	
2016	Yangervis Solarte^{‡}	San Diego Padres	Death of his wife to cancer during the season, caring for their three young daughters	
2017	Chad Bettis	Colorado Rockies	Diagnosed with testicular cancer in November 2016, underwent surgery eight days later, went through chemotherapy until May 2017, and returned to baseball activities one month later	
2018	Stephen Piscotty^{‡}	Oakland Athletics	Death of his mother to amyotrophic lateral sclerosis	
2019	Rich Hill^{‡}	Los Angeles Dodgers	Numerous arm injuries and the public announcement of the death of his son Brooks	
2020	Daniel Bard^{‡}	Colorado Rockies	Prior to the 2020 season, had last pitched in MLB in 2013 and had retired from professional baseball in 2017 due to control issues	
2021†	Trey Mancini^{‡}	Baltimore Orioles	Missed 2020 season after being diagnosed with colon cancer in March that year	
2022	José Cuas^{‡}	Kansas City Royals	Arduous journey to MLB	
2023	Liam Hendriks^{‡}	Chicago White Sox	Non-Hodgkin lymphoma that kept him out of baseball for almost the entire season	
2024	Cam Booser^{‡}	Boston Red Sox	Had retired from baseball in 2017 following injuries and alcohol abuse, returned and made MLB debut	
2025	Tim Hill^{‡}	New York Yankees	Surviving stage 3 colon cancer at age 25	

The award is presented at the annual banquet of the Boston chapter of the BBWAA, which was not held in December 2021, possibly due to the 2021–22 Major League Baseball lockout. The 2021 winner of the Tony Conigliaro Award was instead announced the following year.

== See also ==
- Baseball awards
