= Rick White (baseball) =

American baseball player (born 1968)

- Pitcher
- Born: December 23, 1968 (age 57); Springfield, Ohio, U.S.
- Batted: Right Threw: Right

MLB debut
- April 6, 1994, for the Pittsburgh Pirates

Last MLB appearance
- September 5, 2007, for the Seattle Mariners

MLB statistics
- Win–loss record: 42–54
- Earned run average: 4.45
- Strikeouts: 542
- Stats at Baseball Reference

Teams
- Pittsburgh Pirates (1994–1995); Tampa Bay Devil Rays (1998–2000); New York Mets (2000–2001); Colorado Rockies (2002); St. Louis Cardinals (2002); Chicago White Sox (2003); Houston Astros (2003); Cleveland Indians (2004); Pittsburgh Pirates (2005); Cincinnati Reds (2006); Philadelphia Phillies (2006); Houston Astros (2007); Seattle Mariners (2007)

Richard Allen White (born December 23, 1968) is an American former Major League Baseball relief pitcher. White spent parts of 12 seasons in the majors, working primarily as a relief pitcher. He batted and threw right-handed.

== Playing career ==
After graduating from Kenton Ridge High School in Springfield, Ohio, White attended Paducah Community College. He was drafted by the Pirates in the 15th round of the 1990 June draft, with the 403rd overall pick. After signing quickly, he made his professional debut with the Pirates' affiliate in the Gulf Coast League that fall. White worked primarily as a starting pitcher while advancing through the minors, and he started 14 games as a swingman with the Pirates in 1994 and 1995, before settling in as a reliever with the Tampa Bay Devil Rays.

White enjoyed his best seasons as a professional with the Devil Rays, spending two and a half seasons as a key part of their bullpen, before being traded to the New York Mets in 2000. The Mets acquired White and outfielder Bubba Trammell in exchange for pitcher Paul Wilson and outfielder Jason Tyner. The Mets advanced to the World Series that season, but lost to the New York Yankees in five games.

White appeared in the postseason for a second time in 2002 as a member of the St. Louis Cardinals, who were eliminated in the NLCS by the San Francisco Giants. On June 23, 2006, the Philadelphia Phillies claimed White off waivers from the Cincinnati Reds. On February 2, 2007, the Houston Astros signed White to a minor-league contract. On June 29, 2007, the Astros released White after some ineffective outings. As a reliever for Houston, he was lights out with amazing numbers through Spring Training, allowing him to make the club. April was good for him; going 11.2 innings with 2 ER for an ERA of 1.54. But after going on the disabled list, he had an ERA of 11.72, giving up 23 ER over 17.2 innings. With Houston, White appeared in 23 games, going 1-0 with a 7.67 ERA in 29 1/3 innings. On August 5, 2007, the Seattle Mariners signed him and assigned White to Triple-A Tacoma. On August 23, 2007, White was promoted to the majors, but was placed on waivers and subsequently released by the Mariners on September 6.

White throws four pitches: a fastball, a slider, a curveball, and a forkball.

During pre-game warmups on May 12, 1999, he and pitcher Jim Mecir were involved in a serious collision in the outfield while chasing a fly ball in batting practice. White was unhurt, but Mecir broke his elbow and missed the rest of the season.

== Coaching career ==
White was named pitching coach of the Clark State Eagles in 2022.
