= Tony Saunders =

American baseball player (born 1974)

- Pitcher
- Born: April 29, 1974 (age 52); Baltimore, Maryland, U.S.
- Batted: Left Threw: Left

MLB debut
- April 5, 1997, for the Florida Marlins

Last MLB appearance
- May 26, 1999, for the Tampa Bay Devil Rays

MLB statistics
- Win–loss record: 13–24
- Earned run average: 4.56
- Strikeouts: 305
- Stats at Baseball Reference

Teams
- Florida Marlins (1997); Tampa Bay Devil Rays (1998–1999)

Career highlights and awards
- World Series champion (1997); Tony Conigliaro Award recipient (2000)

Anthony Scott Saunders (born April 29, 1974) is an American former professional baseball pitcher who played in Major League Baseball (MLB) from 1997 to 1999. He was the first player selected in the 1997 MLB expansion draft, by the Tampa Bay Devil Rays. Listed at 6 feet 2 inches (1.88 m) and 205 pounds (93 kg) during his career, he threw and batted left-handed. His career ended prematurely due to injury, suffering a fractured humerus while throwing a pitch during a game on May 26, 1999, and again while delivering a pitch in a rehab game in 2000.

== Career ==
Saunders initially signed with the Florida Marlins' minor league system in 1992, a year before their expansion season. He required reconstructive surgery on his elbow in 1994.

=== Florida Marlins ===
Saunders joined the Marlins' opening day roster in 1997, and despite a knee injury which cost him seven weeks in the middle of the season finished with a 4–6 record in 22 starts, with his first three wins coming against the Atlanta Braves. The Marlins earned a wild card berth in the 1997 playoffs, and after being left off the Division Series roster, Saunders was placed on the LCS roster against the Braves. He started Game 3 of the series, which Liván Hernández won in relief of Saunders.

In the World Series, Saunders started Game 4 against the Cleveland Indians, but took the loss after giving up six earned runs in two innings pitched; nonetheless, he earned a World Series ring as the Marlins defeated Cleveland in seven games.

=== Tampa Bay Devil Rays ===
Saunders was one of many members of that team who left the Marlins following that season, joining the Rays for their inaugural season after being the first pick in the 1997 MLB Expansion Draft. Saunders was 9th in the American League in strikeouts, but also 1st in walks, as he struggled to a 6–15 record. Saunders' 1999 season was short-lived as he went 3–3 with a 6.43 ERA.

==== Injury ====
On May 26, 1999, while pitching against the Texas Rangers, Saunders suffered a significant arm injury while pitching to Juan González. As he delivered a 3–2 pitch to the Rangers slugger, his pitching arm suddenly snapped with enough force that the sound of it could be heard throughout the stadium. Saunders subsequently collapsed on the mound, screaming in pain and smacking his right arm on the ground. Within moments, team trainer Jamie Reed and teammates John Flaherty and Kevin Stocker rushed to his side. Saunders had to be carted off the field, as the pain was too much for him to walk. He was diagnosed with a humerus fracture and torn ligaments in his arm, an injury severe enough to end his season.

Saunders attempted to rehab the injury and make a comeback, and was sent on a rehabilitation assignment in August 2000. He successfully pitched in two games for the Single–A Charleston RiverDogs, then moved to the High–A St. Petersburg Devil Rays. On August 24, during his fifth rehab game, Saunders’s humerus snapped again. With the break occurring in almost the same spot as it had before, Saunders retired immediately afterward, aged 26. Saunders was the 2000 recipient of the Tony Conigliaro Award, which honors a major league player who "overcomes an obstacle and adversity".

After baseball, Saunders worked as a stockbroker. In 2005, Saunders announced a comeback, signing a minor league contract with the Baltimore Orioles, and making their spring training roster. He pitched one inning against the St. Louis Cardinals before he was reassigned to the minor leagues. He remained listed on the Bowie Baysox roster for the whole 2005 season, but never pitched in a game, although he did appear in nine games for the Mesa Miners of the Golden Baseball League.
