= John LeRoy =

American baseball player (1975-2001)

- Pitcher
- Born: April 19, 1975; Bellevue, Washington, U.S.
- Died: June 25, 2001 (aged 26); Sioux City, Iowa, U.S.
- Batted: Right Threw: Right

MLB debut
- September 26, 1997, for the Atlanta Braves

Last MLB appearance
- September 26, 1997, for the Atlanta Braves

MLB statistics
- Win–loss record: 1–0
- Earned run average: 0.00
- Strikeouts: 3
- Stats at Baseball Reference

Teams
- Atlanta Braves (1997)

John Michael LeRoy (April 19, 1975 – June 25, 2001) was an American Major League Baseball pitcher. He played one game with the Atlanta Braves on September 26, 1997, throwing two scoreless innings, giving up one hit and three walks while striking out three more and picking up the victory. On November 18, 1997, he was selected by the Tampa Bay Devil Rays in the expansion draft.

LeRoy died on June 25, 2001, in Sioux City, Iowa, after suffering a heart attack and brain aneurysm. He went into a coma on June 22, and was taken off life support three days later after a CAT scan showed no further brain activity. He died at the age of 26.
