= Rick Gorecki =

American baseball player (born 1973)

- Pitcher
- Born: August 27, 1973 (age 52); Evergreen Park, Illinois, U.S.
- Batted: Right Threw: Right

MLB debut
- September 10, 1997, for the Los Angeles Dodgers

Last MLB appearance
- April 17, 1998, for the Tampa Bay Devil Rays

MLB statistics
- Earned run average: 7.54
- Win–loss record: 2–2
- Strikeouts: 13
- Stats at Baseball Reference

Teams
- Los Angeles Dodgers (1997); Tampa Bay Devil Rays (1998)

Richard John Gorecki (born August 27, 1973) is an American former pitcher in Major League Baseball.

Gorecki was drafted by the Los Angeles Dodgers in the 19th round of the 1991 Major League Baseball draft. He was selected by the Tampa Bay Devil Rays in the 1997 Major League Baseball expansion draft. He began the Rays' inaugural 1998 season in the Rays' rotation, along with Wilson Alvarez, Rolando Arrojo, Tony Saunders, and Dennis Springer, but was injured after three starts and did not pitch again in MLB.
