= Jason Johnson (baseball) =

American baseball player (born 1973)

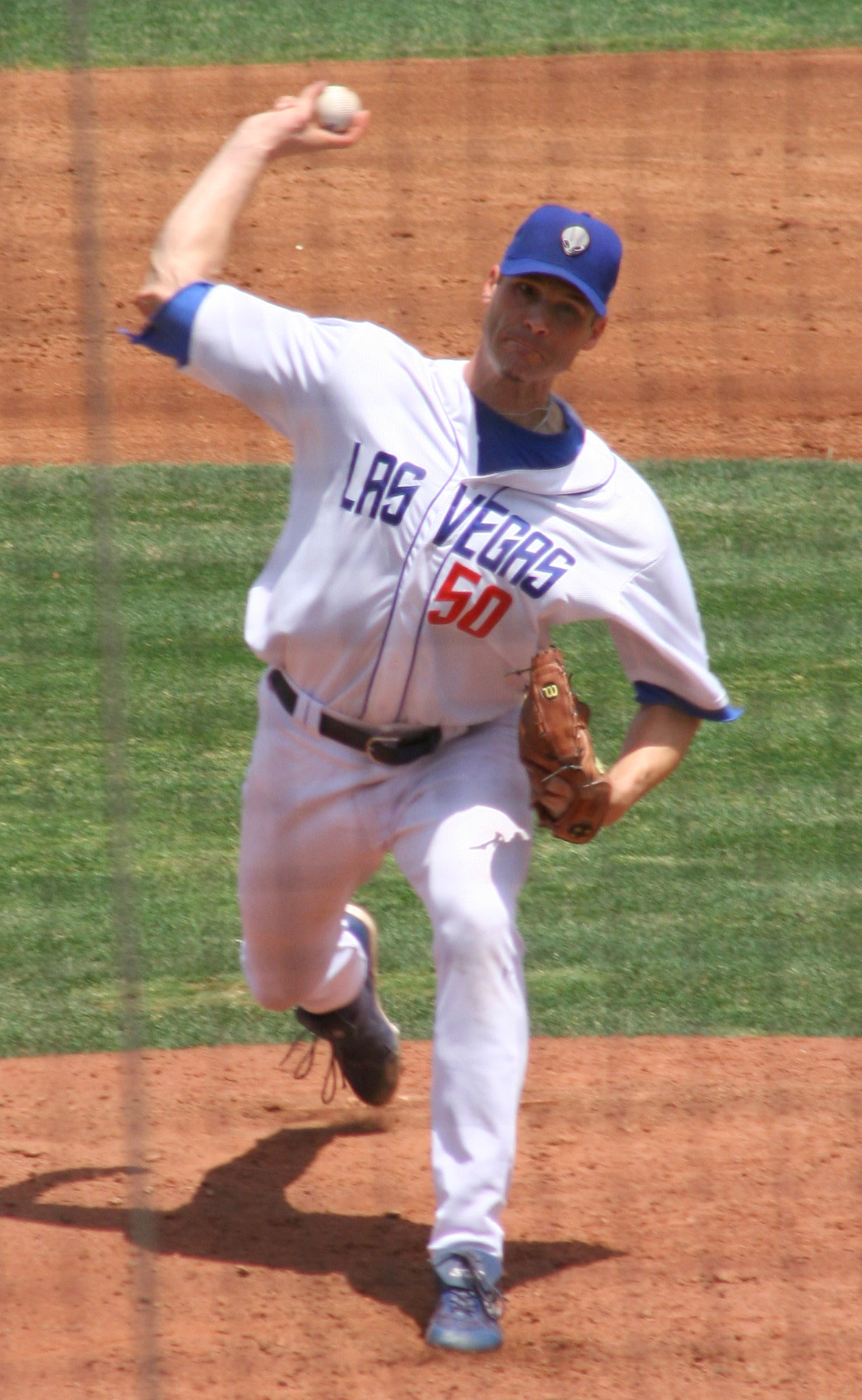
- Johnson with the Las Vegas 51s
- Pitcher
- Born: October 27, 1973 (age 52); Santa Barbara, California, U.S.
- Batted: Right Threw: Right

Professional debut
- MLB: August 27, 1997, for the Pittsburgh Pirates
- NPB: 2007, for the Seibu Lions

Last appearance
- NPB: 2007, for the Seibu Lions
- MLB: September 26, 2008, for the Los Angeles Dodgers

MLB statistics
- Win–loss record: 56–100
- Earned run average: 4.99
- Strikeouts: 810

NPB statistics
- Win–loss record: 1–4
- Earned run average: 4.35
- Strikeouts: 19
- Stats at Baseball Reference

Teams
- Pittsburgh Pirates (1997); Tampa Bay Devil Rays (1998); Baltimore Orioles (1999–2003); Detroit Tigers (2004–2005); Cleveland Indians (2006); Boston Red Sox (2006); Cincinnati Reds (2006); Seibu Lions (2007); Los Angeles Dodgers (2008)

Jason Michael Johnson (born October 27, 1973) is an American former Major League Baseball pitcher. He throws and bats right-handed.

== Career ==
Johnson graduated from Conner High School in Hebron, Kentucky. He did not enter college, but was signed by the Pittsburgh Pirates as an undrafted free agent in 1992. He made his major league debut with the Pirates in 1997, appearing in only three games. Following the season, he was selected in the 1997 Expansion Draft by the newly created franchise, the Tampa Bay Devil Rays. In his lone season in Tampa Bay, Johnson went 2–5 in 13 starts. He was traded to the Baltimore Orioles before the 1999 season. From 1999 to 2003, Johnson was with the Baltimore Orioles, 2001 being his best season of his career, going 10–12 with a career low 4.09 ERA. In 2001, he received the Tony Conigliaro Award.

Johnson signed a two-year deal with the Detroit Tigers prior to the 2004 season. In his first season with Detroit, Johnson posted his worst season as a full-time starter, going 8–15 with an ERA of 5.13 in 196+ innings. On June 8, 2005, Johnson became the first Tigers pitcher to hit a home run in a regular season game since Les Cain in 1971. The homer came against Los Angeles Dodgers pitcher Jeff Weaver, at Dodger Stadium. Despite finishing the season 8–13, Johnson lowered his ERA from the previous season and pitched in a career high 210 innings while posting his lowest K/9 of his career, striking out just 93 while inducing 49 walks.

Johnson signed with Cleveland prior to the 2006 season. He fared no better there, going 3–8 with a 5.96 ERA. He was designated for assignment on June 22, 2006. Before he decided whether or not to accept the assignment, he was traded to the Boston Red Sox for cash. In Boston, his time as a member of the Red Sox was disastrous, going 0–4 with a 7.36 ERA. On August 18, 2006, Johnson was designated for assignment by the Red Sox. He quickly signed a minor league contract with the Cincinnati Reds.

He signed an incentive-laden, one-year, $3 million contract with the Seibu Lions for the 2007 season. He pitched one season in Japan, then on February 7, 2008, signed a minor league contract with an invitation to spring training with the Los Angeles Dodgers. He failed to make the Dodgers opening day roster and was assigned to the Triple-A Las Vegas 51s. On July 18 the Dodgers added him to the 25-man roster. He finished the season with them, going 1–2 with an ERA of 5.22. On January 6, 2009, he signed a minor league contract with an invitation to spring training with the New York Yankees, where he was expected to compete for the final spot in the starting rotation. However, before reporting to spring training, Johnson was diagnosed with choroidal melanoma in his right retina. He began the season in Triple-A Scranton, but suffered a labrum tear in his shoulder. On August 10, 2009, he was released by the Yankees.

He last played for the Amarillo Sox in the American Association of Independent Professional Baseball in 2013.

Johnson has type 1 diabetes and was the first Major League Baseball player to get permission to wear an insulin pump on the field. He wore the pump on his belt on the left side of his lower back, in order to minimize the chance of it being hit by a bat or thrown ball.
