= Matt Ruebel =

American baseball player (born 1969)

- Pitcher
- Born: October 16, 1969 (age 56); Cincinnati, Ohio, U.S.
- Batted: Left Threw: Left

MLB debut
- May 21, 1996, for the Pittsburgh Pirates

Last MLB appearance
- July 4, 1998, for the Tampa Bay Devil Rays

MLB statistics
- Win–loss record: 4–5
- Earned run average: 5.54
- Strikeouts: 78
- Stats at Baseball Reference

Teams
- Pittsburgh Pirates (1996–1997); Tampa Bay Devil Rays (1998)

Matthew Alexander Ruebel (born October 16, 1969) is an American former Major League Baseball (MLB) pitcher who played for the Pittsburgh Pirates and Tampa Bay Devil Rays from 1996 to 1998.

== Amateur career ==
A native of Cincinnati, Ohio, Ruebel attended Ames High School and the University of Oklahoma. In 1988, he played collegiate summer baseball with the Wareham Gatemen of the Cape Cod Baseball League, and returned to the league in 1989 to play for the Harwich Mariners.

== Professional career ==
Ruebel was drafted by the Pittsburgh Pirates in the 3rd round of the 1991 Major League Baseball draft and pitched parts of three major league seasons for the Pirates and Tampa Bay Devil Rays. Ruebel won 4 games in the majors and had one career save, coming on September 15, 1996. In the first game of a doubleheader, Ruebel threw 2 shutout innings to preserve a 4–1 Pirates victory over the Giants.
