= Brad Pennington =

American baseball player (born 1969)

- Pitcher
- Born: April 14, 1969 (age 56); Salem, Indiana, U.S.
- Batted: Left Threw: Left

MLB debut
- April 17, 1993, for the Baltimore Orioles

Last MLB appearance
- September 22, 1998, for the Tampa Bay Devil Rays

MLB statistics
- Win–loss record: 3–6
- Earned run average: 7.02
- Strikeouts: 83
- Stats at Baseball Reference

Teams
- Baltimore Orioles (1993–1995); Cincinnati Reds (1995); Boston Red Sox (1996); California Angels (1996); Tampa Bay Devil Rays (1998)

Brad Lee Pennington (born April 14, 1969) is an American former professional baseball pitcher. Beginning his collegiate career at Vincennes University, Pennington then pitched for Bellarmine University; he was drafted by the Baltimore Orioles in the 12th round of the 1989 amateur draft, and pitched parts of five seasons in Major League Baseball (MLB) between 1993 and 1998.
