= Santos Hernández =

Panamanian baseball player (born 1973)

- Relief pitcher
- Born: 3 November 1973; David, Chiriquí, Panama
- Bats: Right Throws: Right
- Stats at Baseball Reference

Career highlights and awards
- Tigres de Quintana Roo #12 retired

Santos Secundino Hernández (3 November 1973) is a Panamanian former professional baseball relief pitcher. He played for the Panama national baseball team in the 2006 World Baseball Classic. He played professionally from 1994 to 2007.

From 1994 to 1997 he played in the San Francisco Giants organization, playing for the Clinton LumberKings in 1994. That season, made 32 relief appearances, going 5-7 with a 3.75 ERA, striking out 48 batters in 48 innings of work. He played for the Burlington Bees in 1995, going 5-8 with a 2.66 ERA in 44 relief appearances, striking out 85 batters in 64 1/3 innings. With Burlington again in 1996, he had a 3-3 record, 35 saves and a 1.89 ERA in 61 relief appearances, striking out 79 batters and allowing only 39 hits in 66 2/3 innings. He played for the San Jose Giants and Shreveport Captains in 1997, going 2-6 with 15 saves and a 3.47 ERA in 47 relief appearances, striking out 87 in 57 innings of work for San Jose. For the Captains, he went 1-1 with a 2.30 ERA in 11 appearances, saving six games and striking out 14 batters in 15 2/3 innings.

He was taken by the Tampa Bay Devil Rays in the second round of the 1997 expansion draft, and he pitched in their organization until 1999. In 1998, he pitched for the Durham Bulls, going 2-0 with a 4.84 ERA in 53 relief appearances, striking out only 60 batters in 80 innings of work. In 1999, he started the first games of his professional career as he played for Orlando Rays and Durham. With Orlando, he made 35 appearances, starting four games and going 5-4 with a 3.70 ERA and 47 strikeouts in 56 innings of work. In six appearances (four starts) with Durham, he went 0-2 with a 10.80 ERA.

From 2000 to 2005 and in 2007, Hernandez played in the Mexican League. He played for the Tigres del Mexico from 2000 to 2004, the Olmecas de Tabasco and Pericos de Puebla in 2005 and the Petroleros de Minatitlán in 2007. In 2005, he went 0-1 with a 6.39 ERA in 11 games with Puebla and 1-5 with a 6.63 ERA in 18 games with Tabasco. In 2007, he went 2-2 with an 8.38 ERA in eight games with Minatitlan.

Despite being on the team's roster for the 2006 World Baseball Classic, Hernandez did not actually appear in any games for Panama.

In 2014, Tigres de Quintana Roo retired Hernández's 12 number.
