= Rolando Arrojo =

Cuban baseball player (born 1965)

- Pitcher
- Born: July 18, 1965 (age 61); Santa Clara, Cuba
- Batted: Right Threw: Right

MLB debut
- April 1, 1998, for the Tampa Bay Devil Rays

Last MLB appearance
- September 22, 2002, for the Boston Red Sox

MLB statistics
- Win–loss record: 40–42
- Earned run average: 4.55
- Strikeouts: 512
- Stats at Baseball Reference

Teams
- Tampa Bay Devil Rays (1998–1999); Colorado Rockies (2000); Boston Red Sox (2000–2002)

Career highlights and awards
- All-Star (1998)
Medals
Men's baseball
Representing Cuba
Olympic Games
Gold medal – first place	1992 Barcelona	Team
Baseball World Cup
Gold medal – first place	1994 Managua	Team
Intercontinental Cup
Gold medal – first place	1995 Havana	Team
Pan American Games
Gold medal – first place	1995 Mar del Plata	Team
Central American and Caribbean Games
Gold medal – first place	1993 Ponce	Team

Luis Rolando Arrojo Avila (born July 18, 1965) is a Cuban former Major League Baseball pitcher who pitched from 1998 to 2002.

Arrojo made his mark with the teams from Villa Clara in the Cuban National Series, where he still is the all-time leader in hit batsmen. He was the staff ace on the Villa Clara team that won 3 consecutive Cuban National Series in 1993, 1994, and 1995. He was a member of the 1992 Olympic team that won the gold medal.

After defecting from the Cuban national team just before the 1996 Summer Olympics, Arrojo signed with the Tampa Bay Devil Rays in 1997—one year before the team started playing, as that expansion team (along with the Arizona Diamondbacks) was permitted to start and maintain a minor league system starting that year. He made his debut with the expansion Devil Rays in 1998 and was an immediate sensation, becoming the team's first All-Star. He finished 1998 with a strong 14–12 record and a 3.56 ERA in 202 innings, for a team that finished 63–99.

However, in 1999, with teams and hitters more familiar with him and with his developing health problems (as critics claimed, these health problems were due to a lack of conditioning by Arrojo and his refusal to listen to coaches), Arrojo's numbers began to deteriorate, and he showed signs of inability to get left-handed hitters out. He pitched just 140 2/3 innings with a 5.18 ERA. After the season, the Devil Rays traded him to the Colorado Rockies with Aaron Ledesma for Vinny Castilla. Late in 2000, the Rockies in turn traded him with Rich Croushore, Mike Lansing, and cash to the Boston Red Sox for Jeff Frye, Brian Rose, John Wasdin, and minor leaguer Jeff Taglienti. Arrojo spent the rest of the season in the Red Sox rotation, but was largely ineffective. He spent the following two seasons as a part-time starter and a part-time reliever for the Red Sox with moderate success. He was not re-signed after the 2002 season and finished his career with four appearances for the New York Yankees' Triple-A affiliate in Columbus in 2003.

== See also ==
- List of baseball players who defected from Cuba
