= Bob Smith (infielder) =

American baseball player (born 1974)

Bobby Smith
- Infielder
- Born: May 10, 1974 (age 52); Oakland, California, U.S.
- Batted: Right Threw: Right

MLB debut
- March 31, 1998, for the Tampa Bay Devil Rays

Last MLB appearance
- May 6, 2002, for the Tampa Bay Devil Rays

MLB statistics
- Batting average: .232
- Home runs: 21
- Runs batted in: 107
- Stats at Baseball Reference

Teams
- Tampa Bay Devil Rays (1998–2002)

Robert Eugene Smith (born May 10, 1974) is an American former infielder for the Tampa Bay Devil Rays of Major League Baseball. He was drafted in the eleventh round of the 1992 amateur draft by the Atlanta Braves, and was subsequently selected 12th by the Devil Rays in the 1997 MLB Expansion Draft. Bobby is now the hitting instructor in the Arizona Diamondbacks organization.

== Early life ==
Robert “Bobby” Eugene Smith was born on May 10, 1974, in Oakland, California. Bobby was a natural athlete, and he excelled in both basketball and baseball. He was often the best player on the field, and as a youth baseball player he was a six-time all-star and a Bambino League World Series champion. Bobby went to Fremont High School in Oakland, and was a three-year letterman in both Baseball and Basketball. In his Senior year, Bobby was recognized as the Oakland Athletic League’s “Player of the Year,” an award handed out annually to the best ballplayer in the Oakland Unified School district. Bobby was offered, and accepted a full scholarship offer to University of California, Berkeley, but was subsequently selected in the 11th round of the 1992 Major League Baseball draft by the Atlanta Braves, who he signed with on June 5, 1992 .

== Career ==
=== Atlanta Braves ===
Bobby spent 1993 with the Class-A Macon Braves before being brought up to the Class-A advanced Durham Bulls in 1994. It was here that Bobby started to show his potential hitting .266, but slugging 12 homeruns to go along with 18 steals. In 1995, Bobby hit .261 with the Class AA Greenville Braves, slugging 14 homers and swiping 12 bags. He was also regarded as a talented fielder who could play third base and shortstop, as well as outfield. After the season, Baseball America rated him 75th out of the top 100 prospects currently in the minor leagues. In 1996, Smith started the season with the AAA Richmond Braves, and seemed poised for a great season. His numbers dipped from the year before, as he was only able to manage a .256 batting average. His power numbers dipped as well, as he only hit 8 homeruns. However, he did steal 15 bases. After the season, he was removed from baseball America’s top 100. His 1997 season in Richmond did not show much improvement, as he was only able to hit .246. His power numbers, however, rebounded slightly, as he was able to hit 12 homeruns (in 24 less games than the previous season).

=== Tampa Bay Devil Rays ===
Bobby was selected twelfth overall by the Tampa Bay Devil Rays in the 1997 expansion draft, and in 1998 he made his Major League debut. He was selected for the inaugural roster of the Devil Rays, with his role being defined as the 5th infielder, occasional outfielder, who would spell the aging legend, Wade Boggs at third base. Bobby’s major league debut came in the form of a bottom of the ninth, pinch-hit at-bat for starting center fielder, Quentin McCracken. Bobby singled off of Detroit Tigers reliever Bryce Florie. He would go on to have the best season of his professional career, (Majors or minors) hitting .276, with an on base percentage of .343, and a slugging percentage of .422. Bobby hit 11 homeruns in only 117 games. He was regarded as a player of the future, and a possible building block of the Franchise. After the season, Bobby was named (along with teammate Miguel Cairo) to the 1999 Topps Baseball All-Star Rookie Team.

In 1999 Smith spent as much time with AAA Durham as he did with the big club, hitting only .181 in the majors. In the minors however, Smith hit .333, and slugged .613. Smith hit .234, .105, and .175 in 2000, 2001, and 2002 respectively. In that same time frame, he hit .291, .301, and .239 in the minors, proving himself to be an outstanding Minor Leaguer. His last MLB appearance was May 6, 2002, where he went 0-3 against the Boston Red Sox. Shortly thereafter, Smith was designated for assignment by Tampa Bay.

=== Minor Leagues ===
He began his journey through the minors, playing for affiliates of the Milwaukee Brewers, New York Yankees, Chicago White Sox, and Oakland A’s. In 2006, after his second stint with the AAA White Sox affiliate in Charlotte, where he hit .259 with a meager 6 homeruns, Smith retired from baseball at the age of 32.

After Smith’s playing days were over, he joined the Arizona Diamondbacks as a hitting coach. As of July 18, 2016, he is no longer with their organization.

Awards
| Preceded by Scott Rolen | Topps Rookie All-Star Third Baseman; 1998 | Succeeded by Corey Koskie |
