= Terrell Wade =

American baseball player (born 1973)

- Pitcher
- Born: January 25, 1973 (age 52); Rembert, South Carolina, U.S.
- Batted: Left Threw: Left

MLB debut
- September 12, 1995, for the Atlanta Braves

Last MLB appearance
- September 26, 1998, for the Tampa Bay Devil Rays

MLB statistics
- Win–loss record: 8–5
- Earned run average: 3.99
- Strikeouts: 125
- Stats at Baseball Reference

Teams
- Atlanta Braves (1995–1997); Tampa Bay Devil Rays (1998)

Hawatha Terrell Wade (born January 25, 1973) is an American former professional baseball pitcher who played in Major League Baseball.

Wade attended Hillcrest High School in Dalzell, South Carolina where he was teammates on the school's basketball team with Ray Allen. Wade played only one season of high school baseball team on a dare. After graduating in 1991, Wade worked a day job as a bricklayer. In the summer of 1991, he impressed Atlanta Braves scouts during a tryout and was signed to an amateur free agent contract.

Wade earned a World Series ring by pitching in three games in 1995, a total of four innings. His best season as a major leaguer was 1996 in which he pitched in 44 games, going 5–0 with an earned run average of 2.97.

He was selected by the Tampa Bay Devil Rays during the expansion franchise draft following the 1997 season (November 18, 1997; 60th overall). He pitched a total of 10.2 innings with the Devil Rays posting a 5.06 ERA and 2–2 record.

He spent all of 1998 with the Triple A Durham Bulls going 1–7 with a 9.49 ERA in 34 games. The following season he was signed by the Cincinnati Reds but spent all season in the minors.

Wade played in the independent leagues from 2003 to 2004 before retiring.
