= Scott McClain =

American baseball player (born 1972)

- Third baseman
- Born: May 19, 1972 (age 54); Simi Valley, California, U.S.
- Batted: Right Threw: Right

MLB debut
- May 14, 1998, for the Tampa Bay Devil Rays

Last MLB appearance
- September 26, 2008, for the San Francisco Giants

MLB statistics
- Batting average: .192
- Home runs: 2
- Runs batted in: 8
- Stats at Baseball Reference

Teams
- Tampa Bay Devil Rays (1998); Seibu Lions (2001–2004); Chicago Cubs (2005); San Francisco Giants (2007–2008); Hiroshima Toyo Carp (2009)

Scott Michael McClain (born May 19, 1972) is an American former Major League Baseball third baseman who is a scout in Nippon Professional Baseball.

== Early years ==
A versatile athlete, he played quarterback for Atascadero High School in Atascadero, California, and signed a National Letter of Intent to play football for the University of Southern California before being drafted by the Baltimore Orioles.

During his senior year in baseball for the Greyhounds, McClain achieved a batting average of .464 and maintained an earned-run average of 1.74, winning 10 out of his 11 pitching appearances. As a football player, McClain concluded his tenure at AHS with a total of 3,341 passing yards and 25 touchdown passes over a span of two years.

== Professional baseball career ==
McClain has spent the majority of his professional career moving between different minor league teams affiliated with various Major League Baseball organizations. During his time as a major leaguer, he participated in nine games as a member of the Tampa Bay Devil Rays in 1998, 13 games with the Chicago Cubs in 2005, eight games with the San Francisco Giants in 2007, and an additional 14 games with the Giants in 2008.

He played in the Pacific League in Japan for the Seibu Lions from 2001–2004 and in the Central League for the Hiroshima Toyo Carp in 2009.

Over the course of his professional career, McClain achieved a total of 359 home runs, with 287 coming in the minors, 71 in Japan, and two in MLB. He also recorded 1,237 runs batted in, with 1,066 in the minors and 171 in Japan. McClain hit his first home run in the major leagues on September 3, 2008, while playing for the Giants against the Colorado Rockies at Coors Field.

While playing for the Oakland A's Triple-A affiliate, the Sacramento River Cats, in 2006, McClain won the Pacific Coast League Most Valuable Player Award. He was the fourth River Cats player since 2000 to win the award. McClain spent the 2007 and 2008 seasons with the Fresno Grizzlies, Triple-A affiliate of the Giants.

On January 20, 2010, McClain signed a minor league contract with the Chicago Cubs, but as of June 2010 he was not on the roster of any Cubs minor league teams.

== Scouting ==
Later in 2010, Hiroshima added Scott McClain as a U.S.-based scout.
