= Dan Carlson =

American baseball player (born 1970)

- Pitcher / Coach
- Born: January 26, 1970 (age 56); Portland, Oregon, U.S.
- Batted: Right Threw: Right

Professional debut
- MLB: September 15, 1996, for the San Francisco Giants
- NPB: 2000, for the Chunichi Dragons

Last appearance
- MLB: June 23, 1999, for the Arizona Diamondbacks
- NPB: 2000, for the Chunichi Dragons

MLB statistics
- Win–loss record: 1–0
- Earned run average: 6.70
- Strikeouts: 37

NPB statistics
- Win–loss record: 0–0
- Earned run average: 0.00
- Strikeouts: 1
- Stats at Baseball Reference

Teams
- As player: San Francisco Giants (1996–1997); Tampa Bay Devil Rays (1998); Arizona Diamondbacks (1999); Chunichi Dragons (2000); As coach: Arizona Diamondbacks (2022–2024)

Daniel Steven Carlson (born January 26, 1970) is an American former professional baseball pitcher. He played in Major League Baseball (MLB) from 1996 through 1999 for the San Francisco Giants, Tampa Bay Devil Rays, and Arizona Diamondbacks, and in Nippon Professional Baseball (NPB) in 2000 for the Chunichi Dragons.

== Playing career ==
Carlson played college baseball at Mt. Hood Community College, a member of the Northwest Athletic Association of Community Colleges (NWAACC) based in Gresham, Oregon. He was selected by the San Francisco Giants in the 33rd round of the 1989 MLB draft. Carlson played in Minor League Baseball from 1990 through 2001, appearing in 311 games (202 starts) while compiling a 105–69 win–loss record. He spent most of his career, parts of nine seasons, at the Triple-A level.

Carlson made his major-league debut in 1996 with the Giants, appearing in five games, then made six appearances with the Giants in 1997. In November 1997, he was selected by the Tampa Bay Devil Rays in the 1997 MLB expansion draft. He made 10 appearances with Tampa Bay in 1998, became a free agent after the season, then signed with the Arizona Diamondbacks. He made two appearances with Arizona during the 1999 season, his last in MLB. In 23 total major-league appearances, all in relief, Carlson registered one win and had a 6.70 earned run average (ERA), while striking out 37 batters in 47 innings pitched. He pitched briefly in Japan for the Chunichi Dragons during the 2000 season—appearing in two games in relief, he allowed no runs and one hit in 2 1/3 innings. While playing in Japan, he requested a leave of absence due to an illness in his family, but was granted his release and completed the season in Triple-A with the Tucson Sidewinders.

== Coaching career ==
Carlson later served as the pitching coach for the Mobile BayBears, an Arizona Diamondbacks farm team, during 2007 and 2010–2013. In December 2013, he was named the minor league pitching coordinator for the Diamondbacks. In November 2021, Carlson was named assistant pitching coach for the Diamondbacks. On October 3, 2024, Carlson was fired by the Diamondbacks.
