= Ramón Tatís =

Dominican baseball player (born 1973)

- Pitcher
- Born: January 5, 1973 (age 52); Guayubín, Dominican Republic
- Batted: Left Threw: Left

Professional debut
- MLB: April 6, 1997, for the Chicago Cubs
- NPB: August 30, 2000, for the Nippon-Ham Fighters

Last appearance
- MLB: September 27, 1998, for the Tampa Bay Devil Rays
- NPB: August 30, 2000, for the Nippon-Ham Fighters

MLB statistics
- Win–loss record: 1–1
- Earned run average: 6.82
- Strikeouts: 38

NPB statistics
- Win–loss record: 0–0
- Earned run average: 54.00
- Strikeouts: 0
- Stats at Baseball Reference

Teams
- Chicago Cubs (1997); Tampa Bay Devil Rays (1998); Nippon-Ham Fighters (2000)

Ramón Francisco Tatis Medrano (born January 5, 1973) is a Dominican former Major League Baseball pitcher. He was signed by the New York Mets as an amateur free agent in 1990 and played parts of two seasons in the majors, 1997 and 1998. He also played in Japan for the Nippon-Ham Fighters in 2000.
