= Mike Duvall =

American baseball player (born 1974)

- Pitcher
- Born: October 11, 1974 (age 51); Warrenton, Virginia, U.S.
- Batted: Right Threw: Left

MLB debut
- September 22, 1998, for the Tampa Bay Devil Rays

Last MLB appearance
- October 4, 2001, for the Minnesota Twins

MLB statistics
- Won-lost record: 1-1
- Earned run average: 4.76
- Strikeouts: 23
- Stats at Baseball Reference

Teams
- Tampa Bay Devil Rays (1998–2000); Minnesota Twins (2001)

This is an article about Mike Duvall, the major league baseball pitcher. For the former California State Assemblyman, see Michael D. Duvall

Michael Alan Duvall (born October 11, 1974) is an American former professional baseball pitcher. He was drafted by the Florida Marlins in the 19th round of the 1995 Major League Baseball draft, and pitched parts of four seasons in the Major League Baseball (MLB) for the Tampa Bay Devil Rays and Minnesota Twins.
