= Rich Butler =

Canadian baseball player (born 1973)

- Outfielder
- Born: May 1, 1973 (age 53); Toronto, Ontario, Canada
- Batted: Left Threw: Right

MLB debut
- September 6, 1997, for the Toronto Blue Jays

Last MLB appearance
- August 4, 1999, for the Tampa Bay Devil Rays

MLB statistics
- Batting average: .223
- Home runs: 7
- Runs batted in: 22
- Stats at Baseball Reference

Teams
- Toronto Blue Jays (1997); Tampa Bay Devil Rays (1998–1999)

Richard Dwight Butler (born May 1, 1973) is a Canadian former outfielder in Major League Baseball for the Toronto Blue Jays and Tampa Bay Devil Rays. He is the brother of another former Blue Jay, Rob Butler.

== Career ==
Butler was signed as a non-drafted free agent by the Toronto Blue Jays on September 24, 1990. After seven years in Minor League Baseball, he was called up to play for the major league club on September 6, 1997. He played seven games that season with the Blue Jays.

In the Major League Baseball expansion draft of 1997, Butler was selected 10th overall by the Tampa Bay Devil Rays. In Tampa Bay's inaugural season of 1998, Butler played in 72 games at the major league level and 38 games with the Triple-A Durham Bulls.

Butler remained at AAA Durham in 1999, where he played 90 games. He was called up to the Devil Rays again, but this time only for seven games.

On October 15, 1999, Butler was granted free agency. A month later, he was signed by the Seattle Mariners, although he never made it back to the big leagues.

After his MLB career Butler played for the minor league Toronto Maple Leafs from 2001 to 2002.

== Alleged fraud ==
On October 20, 2026 the Durham Regional Police announced that Butler and his wife Michelle Butler were charged with fraud over $5,000, possession of property obtained by crime over $5,000 and uttering a forged document.

It was alleged that $60,000 in registration fees was collected from families for the Ontario Devil Rays youth baseball program in Bowmanville between April and October 2025, but funds were allegedly diverted to personal accounts without services being delivered.
