= Dennis Springer =

American baseball player (born 1965)

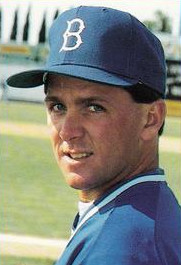
- Springer in 1988
- Pitcher
- Born: February 12, 1965 (age 61); Fresno, California, U.S.
- Batted: Right Threw: Right

MLB debut
- September 13, 1995, for the Philadelphia Phillies

Last MLB appearance
- May 26, 2002, for the Los Angeles Dodgers

MLB statistics
- Win–loss record: 24–48
- Earned run average: 5.18
- Strikeouts: 296
- Stats at Baseball Reference

Teams
- Philadelphia Phillies (1995); California/Anaheim Angels (1996–1997); Tampa Bay Devil Rays (1998); Florida Marlins (1999); New York Mets (2000); Los Angeles Dodgers (2001–2002)

Dennis Leroy Springer (born February 12, 1965) is an American former professional baseball right-handed pitcher, who played in Major League Baseball (MLB) for the Philadelphia Phillies, California Angels, Tampa Bay Devil Rays, Florida Marlins, New York Mets, and Los Angeles Dodgers. He is most remembered for his use of the knuckleball.

As a member of the Dodgers, Springer surrendered Barry Bonds' Major League record-setting 73rd home run on October 7, 2001. The homer came off a 3–2 pitch clocked at 43 miles per hour (a knuckleball) in the bottom of the first inning of Los Angeles' 2–1 loss to the San Francisco Giants.

In an eight-season career, he had a record of 24–48, with a 5.18 ERA in 655.1 innings pitched. He had four career shutouts, two of those coming in his time with the Marlins in 1999.
