= Kevin Stocker =

American baseball player (born 1970)

- Shortstop
- Born: February 13, 1970 (age 56); Spokane, Washington, U.S.
- Batted: Switch Threw: Right

MLB debut
- July 7, 1993, for the Philadelphia Phillies

Last MLB appearance
- September 29, 2000, for the Anaheim Angels

MLB statistics
- Batting average: .254
- Home runs: 23
- Runs batted in: 248
- Stats at Baseball Reference

Teams
- Philadelphia Phillies (1993–1997); Tampa Bay Devil Rays (1998–2000); Anaheim Angels (2000)

Kevin Douglas Stocker (born February 13, 1970) is an American former Major League Baseball shortstop and switch hitter. Stocker played with the Philadelphia Phillies (1993–1997), Tampa Bay Devil Rays (1998–2000) and Anaheim Angels (2000).

A 1988 graduate of Central Valley High School in Spokane Valley, Stocker attended the University of Washington in Seattle, where he played college baseball for the Huskies from 1989–1991. Stocker was also a member of the fraternity Lambda Chi Alpha.

Stocker was selected by Philadelphia in the 1991 MLB draft, taken in the second round with the 54th overall selection. He made his major league debut in 1993 on July 7 at Veterans Stadium in a marathon game that lasted 6 hours and 10 minutes. Stocker played all 20 innings in the defeat of the Los Angeles Dodgers 7-6. Stocker had nine plate appearances in the game, the most by any player in his Major League debut. As of 2020, no other player has had more than seven.

In his rookie season, Stocker batted .324 with two home runs and 31 RBI in 70 games. He was the regular Phillies shortstop through the 1997 season. In 1997 he enjoyed his best season, compiling career-highs in games played (149), runs (51), doubles (23) and stolen bases (11), adding five triples, four homers and 41 RBI.

During the 1997 expansion draft, Stocker was traded to Tampa Bay in exchange for Bobby Abreu. After two-plus seasons, he was released and signed with Anaheim. In an eight-season career, Stocker batted .254 with 23 home runs and 248 RBI. He now owns an Emerald City Smoothie franchise in Washington.

== Post-playing career ==
Stocker has served as a color analyst for 14 seasons (as of 2014). He is currently in his second season with the Pac-12 Network, after a stint with CBS Sports Network.

In January 2018, it was announced that Stocker would be serving as a part-time color analyst for Phillies radio broadcasts during the 2018 season. Stocker rejoined the radio broadcast team on a part-time basis again in 2022. His role expanded in 2023, handling the vast majority of Phillies away games and home broadcasts in which Larry Andersen is not available. Stocker began calling play-by-play for the 4th and 5th innings of Phillies radio broadcasts for which he was present in 2026, with lead play-by-play announcer Scott Franzke handling color commentary during those innings.
