= Esteban Yan =

Dominican baseball player (born 1975)

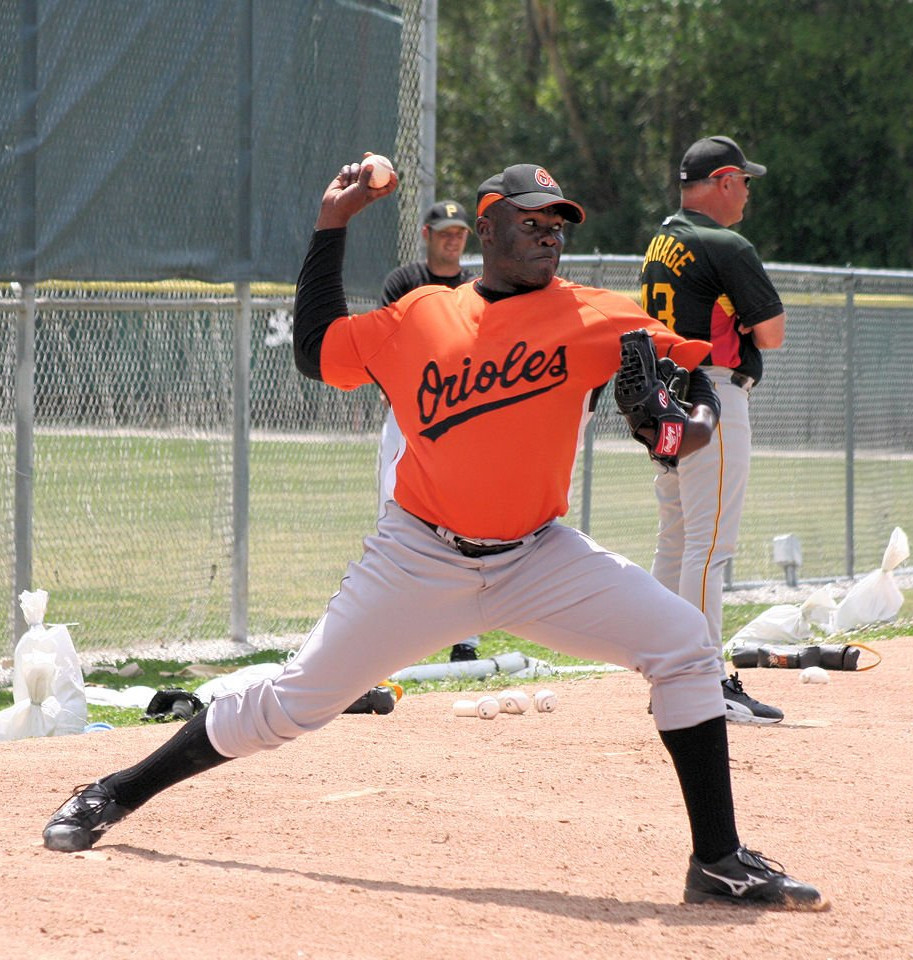
- Pitcher
- Born: June 22, 1975 (age 51); Campiña del Seibo, Dominican Republic
- Batted: Right Threw: Right

Professional debut
- MLB: May 20, 1996, for the Baltimore Orioles
- NPB: April 3, 2007, for the Hanshin Tigers
- KBO: August 26, 2008, for the SK Wyverns

Last appearance
- MLB: July 6, 2006, for the Cincinnati Reds
- NPB: August 21, 2007, for the Hanshin Tigers
- KBO: October 2, 2008, for the SK Wyverns

MLB statistics
- Win–loss record: 33–39
- Earned run average: 5.14
- Strikeouts: 553

NPB statistics
- Win–loss record: 6–5
- Earned run average: 4.66
- Strikeouts: 52

KBO statistics
- Win–loss record: 1–2
- Earned run average: 2.15
- Strikeouts: 17
- Stats at Baseball Reference

Teams
- Baltimore Orioles (1996–1997); Tampa Bay Devil Rays (1998–2002); Texas Rangers (2003); St. Louis Cardinals (2003); Detroit Tigers (2004); Los Angeles Angels of Anaheim (2005–2006); Cincinnati Reds (2006); Hanshin Tigers (2007); SK Wyverns (2008)

Esteban Luis Yan (born June 22, 1975) is a Dominican former professional baseball pitcher. He played in all or parts of 11 seasons in Major League Baseball. At 6 ft 4 in (1.93 m), 275 lb (125 kg), he batted and threw right-handed.

== Early years ==
Yan was originally signed by the Atlanta Braves as an amateur free agent in 1990. He was traded along with Tony Tarasco and Roberto Kelly from the Braves to the Montreal Expos for Marquis Grissom on April 6, 1995. After spending time in the minor leagues, he made his major league debut with the Baltimore Orioles on May 20, 1996.

== Professional career ==
=== Baltimore ===
Yan made his major league debut on May 20, 1996 with the Baltimore Orioles. He appeared in just four games with the Orioles that season while making just 3 appearances the following season.

=== Tampa Bay ===
In 1998, Yan pitched for the Tampa Bay Devil Rays. In 64 games, he posted an ERA of 3.86 in 88 2/3 innings. In 1999, his ERA ballooned to 5.90 in 50 games. In 2000, Yan pitched between the rotation and the bullpen, appearing in 43 games while starting 20 of them. He was 7–8 in 137 2/3 innings.

On June 4, 2000, Yan hit a home run in his first major league at-bat, on the first pitch. His next plate appearance resulted in a sacrifice bunt, which does not count as an official at bat. In his only other career plate appearance (on June 30, 2003, as a member of the St. Louis Cardinals), he hit a single, giving him a 1.000 batting average and a 2.500 slugging percentage.

In the 2001 season, Yan served as closer for the Devil Rays, saving 22 games in 54 appearances. Yan began the 2002 season as the Devil Rays closer before being removed of the role during the season, he finished with a record of 7–8 in 55 games with 19 saves.

=== Texas ===
On December 26, 2002, Yan signed a one-year deal with the Texas Rangers. In 15 games, he was 0–1 with a 6.94 ERA.

=== St. Louis ===
He was traded to the St. Louis Cardinals on May 26, 2003, for a minor league outfielder and cash.

=== Detroit ===
In 2004, Yan pitched for the Detroit Tigers. He rebounded from the previous three seasons, as his ERA sat at a career-low 3.83 in a career-high 69 appearances.

=== California ===
In 2005, Yan pitched for the Angels. He was 1–1 in 49 games. In 2006, he began the season with the Angels.

=== Cincinnati ===
He was then traded to the Cincinnati Reds on May 30.

=== Asia ===
Yan spent the 2007 season as a pitcher for the Hanshin Tigers of Nippon Professional Baseball's Central League. In 2008, Yan rejoined the Orioles organization, but this time with its minor league affiliate the Norfolk Tides. Yan was released on July 18, 2008. He signed with SK Wyverns of the Korean Baseball League in July 2008 and spent the rest of the season with them.

=== Mexico ===
Yan spent the first half of 2009 pitching for the Bridgeport Bluefish, an unaffiliated minor league team in the Atlantic League. On August 11, 2009, Yan signed a minor league contract with the Florida Marlins and was assigned to the New Orleans Zephyrs. However, he failed the physical and stayed with Bridgeport. He signed with the Diablos Rojos del México to start 2010, then returned to the Bluefish, by whom he was activated on August 17. He returned to the Bluefish in 2011, splitting the season between Bridgeport and the Vaqueros Laguna of the Mexican League. He signed with the Saraperos de Saltillo for the 2012 season.

== Television ==
Yan is the first member of the Tampa Bay Rays to be named on The Simpsons. In the March 16, 2003, episode entitled "C. E. D'oh!," Bart Simpson exclaims "Look at me! I'm Tomokazu Ohka of the Montreal Expos!" while playing baseball, to which Milhouse replies "Well, I'm Esteban Yan of the Tampa Bay Devil Rays!", referencing the relative obscurity of the two pitchers and their respective teams.

== See also ==
- List of Major League Baseball players with a home run in their first major league at bat
