= Jim Mecir =

American baseball player (born 1970)

- Pitcher
- Born: May 16, 1970 (age 56); Queens, New York, U.S.
- Batted: Switch Threw: Right

MLB debut
- September 4, 1995, for the Seattle Mariners

Last MLB appearance
- September 28, 2005, for the Florida Marlins

MLB statistics
- Win–loss record: 29–35
- Earned run average: 3.77
- Strikeouts: 450
- Stats at Baseball Reference

Teams
- Seattle Mariners (1995); New York Yankees (1996–1997); Tampa Bay Devil Rays (1998–2000); Oakland Athletics (2000–2004); Florida Marlins (2005)

James Jason Mecir (born May 16, 1970) is an American former Major League Baseball pitcher who played for five teams over an 11-year career between 1995 and 2005.

Mecir is notable for having overcome a club foot to become an effective Major League pitcher, as well as for regularly throwing a screwball. He spent 4 1/2 years as a member of the Oakland Athletics and is prominently mentioned in Michael Lewis's bestselling book Moneyball: The Art of Winning an Unfair Game.

== Career ==
Mecir attended Eckerd College, and in 1990 he played collegiate summer baseball with the Falmouth Commodores of the Cape Cod Baseball League. He was selected by the Seattle Mariners in the third round of the 1991 amateur draft. He played for Seattle in 1995, the New York Yankees in 1996 and 1997, the Tampa Bay Devil Rays from 1998 to 2000, the Oakland Athletics from 2001 to 2004, before spending the last year of his career with the Marlins. He announced his retirement on October 2, 2005, following the Marlins' last game of the season.

Mecir was inducted into the Suffolk Sports Hall of Fame on Long Island, New York, in the Baseball Category with the Class of 2011.

== Adversity ==
In 2003, Mecir received the Tony Conigliaro Award, given annually to the player who most effectively overcomes adversity to succeed in baseball. Mecir was born with two club feet; despite several childhood surgeries that enabled him to walk, he was left with a right leg that was one inch shorter than his left leg and a right calf that was only half the size of his left calf.

On May 15, 2005, Mecir pitched poorly in a game against the Padres, and ESPN analyst John Kruk cited Mecir's limp (not knowing about his birth defect) when Mecir walked to the mound. Kruk presented this as evidence that the Marlins were negligent for asking Mecir to pitch (while Mecir appeared to be injured). Kruk came under heavy public criticism for being insensitive, even though Kruk was unaware. However, Mecir did not take offense when informed of the remark.
