= 1998 Los Angeles Dodgers season =

1998 Los Angeles Dodgers
- League: National League
- Division: West
- Ballpark: Dodger Stadium
- City: Los Angeles
- Record: 83–79 (.512)
- Divisional place: 3rd
- Owners: Fox Entertainment Group
- President: Bob Graziano
- General managers: Fred Claire, Tommy Lasorda
- Managers: Bill Russell, Glenn Hoffman
- Television: Fox Sports West 2; KTLA (5)
- Radio: XTRA Sports 1150 (Vin Scully, Ross Porter, Rick Monday); KWKW (Jaime Jarrín, René Cárdenas, Pepe Yñiguez)

The 1998 Los Angeles Dodgers season was the 109th for the franchise in Major League Baseball, and their 41st season in Los Angeles, California. It was the first season since the sale of the franchise from Peter O'Malley to the Fox Entertainment Group took effect. The new corporate executives would quickly anger Dodger fans when they bypassed General Manager Fred Claire and made one of the biggest trades in franchise history. They traded All-Star catcher Mike Piazza and starting third baseman Todd Zeile to the Florida Marlins for a package that included Gary Sheffield.

The team on the field performed poorly under all the stress and soon Fox fired Claire and manager Bill Russell, replacing them with former Manager Tommy Lasorda, who was appointed interim GM and Minor League manager Glenn Hoffman who took over for Russell. The team limped along to finish in third place in the National League West and more changes were in the offing for the following season.

== Regular season ==
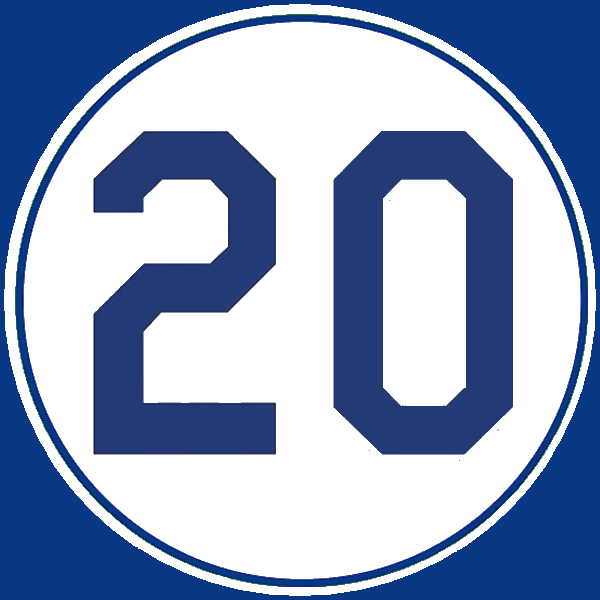
Don Sutton's number 20 was retired by the Los Angeles Dodgers in 1998.

=== Season standings ===
NL West
Team	W	L	Pct.	GB	Home	Road
San Diego Padres	98	64	.605	—	54‍–‍27	44‍–‍37
San Francisco Giants	89	74	.546	9½	49‍–‍32	40‍–‍42
Los Angeles Dodgers	83	79	.512	15	48‍–‍33	35‍–‍46
Colorado Rockies	77	85	.475	21	42‍–‍39	35‍–‍46
Arizona Diamondbacks	65	97	.401	33	34‍–‍47	31‍–‍50

=== Record vs. opponents ===
1998 National League record Source: MLB Standings Grid – 1998
Team	AZ	ATL	CHC	CIN	COL	FLA	HOU	LAD	MIL	MON	NYM	PHI	PIT	SD	SF	STL	AL
Arizona	—	1–8	5–7	4–5	6–6	6–2	4–5	4–8	6–3	2–7	4–5	2–7	6–3	3–9	5–7	2–7	5–8
Atlanta	8–1	—	3–6	7–2	5–3	7–5	4–5	8–1	7–2	6–6	9–3	8–4	7–2	5–4	7–2	6–3	9–7
Chicago	7–5	6–3	—	6–5	7–2	7–2	4–7	4–5	6–6	7–2	4–5	3–6	8–3	5–4	7–3	4–7	5–8
Cincinnati	5–4	2–7	5–6	—	4–5	9–0	3–8	5–4	6–5	8–1	3–6	4–5	5–7	1–11	2–7	8–3	7-6
Colorado	6–6	3–5	2–7	5–4	—	6–3	6–5	6–6	4–7	7–2	3–6	5–4	5–4	5–7	7–5	3–6	4–8
Florida	2–6	5–7	2–7	0–9	3–6	—	3–6	4–5	0–9	5–7	5–7	6–6	3–6	4–5	0–9	4–5	8–8
Houston	5–4	5–4	7–4	8–3	5–6	6–3	—	3–6	9–2	7–2	5–4	7–2	9–2	5–4	6–3	5–7	10–4
Los Angeles	8–4	1–8	5–4	4–5	6–6	5–4	6–3	—	5–4	5–4	3–5	5–4	7–5	5–7	6–6	4–5	8–5
Milwaukee	3–6	2–7	6–6	5–6	7–4	9–0	2–9	4–5	—	6–3	1–8	4–5	6–5	3–6	5–4	3–8	8–6
Montreal	7–2	6–6	2–7	1–8	2–7	7–5	2–7	4–5	3–6	—	8–4	5–7	2–7	4–4	3–6	3–6	6–10
New York	5–4	3–9	5–4	6–3	6–3	7–5	4–5	5–3	8–1	4–8	—	8–4	4–5	4–5	4–5	6–3	9–7
Philadelphia	7-2	4–8	6–3	5–4	4–5	6–6	2–7	4–5	5–4	7–5	4–8	—	8–1	1–8	2–6	3–6	7–9
Pittsburgh	3–6	2–7	3–8	7–5	4–5	6–3	2–9	5–7	5–6	7–2	5–4	1–8	—	5–4	2–7	6–5	6–7
San Diego	9–3	4–5	4–5	11–1	7–5	5–4	4–5	7–5	6–3	4–4	5–4	8–1	4–5	—	8–4	6–3	6–7
San Francisco	7–5	2–7	3–7	7–2	5–7	9–0	3–6	6–6	4–5	6–3	5–4	6–2	7–2	4–8	—	7–5	8–5
St. Louis	7–2	3–6	7–4	3–8	6–3	5-4	7–5	5–4	8–3	6–3	3–6	6–3	5–6	3–6	5–7	—	4–9

=== Opening Day lineup ===
Opening Day starters
Name	Position
Eric Young	Second baseman
José Vizcaíno	Shortstop
Mike Piazza	Catcher
Todd Zeile	Third baseman
Raúl Mondesí	Right fielder
Paul Konerko	First baseman
Todd Hollandsworth	Left fielder
Trenidad Hubbard	Center fielder
Ramón Martínez	Starting pitcher

=== Notable transactions ===
- May 15, 1998: Acquired Bobby Bonilla, Jim Eisenreich, Charles Johnson, Gary Sheffield and Manuel Barrios from the Florida Marlins for Mike Piazza and Todd Zeile
- June 4, 1998: Acquired Dave Mlicki and Greg McMichael from the New York Mets for Hideo Nomo and Brad Clontz
- July 4, 1998: Acquired Jeff Shaw from the Cincinnati Reds for Paul Konerko and Dennys Reyes
- July 10, 1998: Acquired Brian Bohanon from the New York Mets for Greg McMichael
- July 23, 1998: Acquired Widd Workman from the San Diego Padres for Jim Bruske
- July 31, 1998: Acquired Mark Grudzielanek, Carlos Perez and Hiram Bocachica from the Montreal Expos for Wilton Guerrero, Ted Lilly, Peter Bergeron and Jonathan Tucker

=== Roster ===
1998 Los Angeles Dodgers
Roster
Pitchers: 27 Manuel Barrios; 57 Brian Bohanon; 46 Jim Bruske; 50 Will Brunson; 50 Brad Clontz; 37 Darren Dreifort; 44 Mark Guthrie; 52 Darren Hall; 60 Mike Judd; 67 Jeff Kubenka; 49 Frank Lankford; 58 Sean Maloney; 48 Ramón Martínez; 35 Greg McMichael; 38 Dave Mlicki; 16 Hideo Nomo; 13 Antonio Osuna; 61 Chan Ho Park; 33 Carlos Pérez; 36 Scott Radinsky; 49 Gary Rath; 57 Dennys Reyes; 41 Jeff Shaw; 59 Ismael Valdes; 56 Eric Weaver	Catchers: 26 Charles Johnson; 64,36 Paul Lo Duca; 63 Ángel Peña; 31 Mike Piazza; 15 Tom Prince; Infielders: 29 Adrián Beltré; 25 Bobby Bonilla; 17,25 Juan Castro; 3 Alex Cora; 16 Mark Grudzielanek; 30 Wilton Guerrero; 23 Eric Karros; 7 Paul Konerko; 62 Mike Metcalfe; 5,10 José Vizcaíno; 21 Eric Young; 27 Todd Zeile	Outfielders: 45 Roger Cedeño; 12 Mike Devereaux; 12 Jim Eisenreich; 28 Todd Hollandsworth; 70 Damon Hollins; 22 Thomas Howard; 47 Trenidad Hubbard; 40 Matt Luke; 43 Raúl Mondesí; 5,10 Gary Sheffield; Other batters: 41 Tripp Cromer	Manager: 35 Glenn Hoffman; 18 Bill Russell; Coaches: 8 Joey Amalfitano (third base); 58 Mark Cresse (bullpen); 33 Glenn Gregson (pitching); 9 Mickey Hatcher (hitting); 49 Charlie Hough (pitching); 11 Manny Mota; 14 Mike Scioscia (bench); 31 John Shelby (1st base); 9 Reggie Smith (hitting/1st base)

== Starting Pitchers stats ==
Note: G = Games pitched; GS = Games started; IP = Innings pitched; W/L = Wins/Losses; ERA = Earned run average; BB = Walks allowed; SO = Strikeouts; CG = Complete games

Name	G	GS	IP	W/L	ERA	BB	SO	CG
Chan Ho Park	34	34	220.2	15-9	3.71	97	191	2
Darren Dreifort	32	26	180.0	8-12	4.00	57	168	1
Ismael Valdez	27	27	174.0	11-10	3.98	66	122	2
Dave Mlicki	20	20	124.1	7-3	4.05	38	78	2
Ramón Martínez	15	15	101.2	7-3	2.83	41	91	1
Brian Bohanon	14	14	97.1	5-7	2.40	36	72	2
Carlos Perez	11	11	77.2	4-4	3.24	30	46	4
Hideo Nomo	12	12	67.2	2-7	5.05	38	73	2

== Relief Pitchers stats ==
Note: G = Games pitched; GS = Games started; IP = Innings pitched; W/L = Wins/Losses; ERA = Earned run average; BB = Walks allowed; SO = Strikeouts; SV = Saves

Name	G	GS	IP	W/L	ERA	BB	SO	SV
Jeff Shaw	34	0	35.1	1-4	2.55	7	26	25
Scott Radinsky	62	0	61.2	6-6	2.63	20	45	13
Antonio Osuna	54	0	64.2	7-1	3.06	32	72	6
Mark Guthrie	53	0	54.0	2-1	3.50	24	45	0
Jim Bruske	35	0	44.0	3-0	3.48	19	31	1
Dennys Reyes	11	3	28.2	0-4	4.71	20	33	0
Brad Clontz	18	0	20.2	2-0	5.66	10	14	0
Frank Lankford	12	0	19.2	0-2	5.95	7	7	1
Greg McMichael	12	0	14.1	0-1	4.40	6	11	1
Sean Maloney	11	0	12.2	0-1	4.97	5	11	0
Mike Judd	7	0	11.1	0-0	15.09	9	14	0
Darren Hall	11	0	11.1	0-3	10.32	5	8	0
Eric Weaver	7	0	9.2	2-0	0.93	6	5	0
Jeff Kubenka	6	0	9.1	1-0	0.96	8	10	0
Gary Rath	3	0	3.1	0-0	10.80	2	4	0
Will Brunson	2	0	2.1	0-1	11.57	2	1	0
Manuel Barrios	1	0	1.0	0-0	0.00	2	0	0

== Batting Stats ==
Note: Pos = Position; G = Games played; AB = At bats; Avg. = Batting average; R = Runs scored; H = Hits; HR = Home runs; RBI = Runs batted in; SB = Stolen bases

Name	Pos	G	AB	Avg.	R	H	HR	RBI	SB
Charles Johnson	C	102	346	.217	31	75	12	35	3
Mike Piazza	C	37	149	.282	20	42	9	30	0
Tom Prince	C	37	81	.185	7	115	0	5	0
Paul Lo Duca	C	6	14	.286	2	4	0	1	0
Ángel Peña	C	6	13	.231	1	3	0	0	0
Eric Karros	1B	139	507	.296	59	150	23	87	7
Eric Young	2B	117	452	.285	78	129	8	43	42
José Vizcaíno	SS	67	237	.262	30	62	3	29	7
Adrián Beltré	3B/SS	77	195	.215	18	42	7	22	3
Bobby Bonilla	3B/LF	72	236	.237	28	56	7	30	1
Juan Castro	2B/SS	89	220	.195	25	43	2	14	0
Mark Grudzielanek	SS	51	193	.264	11	51	2	21	7
Wilton Guerrero	2B/SS/LF/CF	64	180	.283	21	51	0	7	5
Todd Zeile	3B/1B	40	158	.253	22	40	7	27	1
Paul Konerko	1B/3B/LF	49	144	.215	14	31	0	2	0
Alex Cora	SS/2B	29	33	.121	1	4	0	0	0
Tripp Cromer	IF	6	6	.167	1	11	1	1	0
Mike Metcalfe	2B	4	1	.000	0	0	0	0	2
Gary Sheffield	RF	90	301	.316	52	95	16	57	18
Raúl Mondesí	CF/RF	148	580	.279	85	162	30	90	16
Todd Hollandsworth	LF/CF/RF	55	175	.269	23	47	3	20	4
Roger Cedeño	LF/CF/RF	105	240	.242	33	58	2	17	8
Trenidad Hubbard	CF/LF/RF/3B	94	208	.298	29	62	7	18	9
Matt Luke	LF/RF/1B	69	160	.213	24	34	9	23	2
Jim Eisenreich	LF/1B/RF	75	127	.197	12	25	0	6	4
Thomas Howard	CF/LF/RF	47	76	.184	9	14	2	4	1
Mike Devereaux	CF/LF/RF	9	13	.308	0	4	0	1	0
Damon Hollins	RF/LF	5	9	.222	1	2	0	2	0

== 1998 Awards ==
- 1998 Major League Baseball All-Star Game
  - Gary Sheffield reserve
  - Jeff Shaw reserve (selected as a member of the Cincinnati Reds but was traded to the Dodgers during the break and made his first appearance in a Dodger uniform in the All-Star Game)
- Gold Glove Award
  - Charles Johnson
- NL Pitcher of the Month
  - Chan Ho Park (July 1998)
- NL Player of the Week
  - Mike Piazza (April 6–12)
  - Mike Piazza (April 20–26)
  - Raúl Mondesí (June 29 – July 5)

== Farm system ==
Level	Team	League	Manager
AAA	Albuquerque Dukes	Pacific Coast League	Glenn Hoffman; Ron Roenicke
AA	San Antonio Missions	Texas League	Ron Roenicke; Lance Parrish
High A	San Bernardino Stampede	California League	Mickey Hatcher; Joe Vavra; Tim Wallach
High A	Vero Beach Dodgers	Florida State League	John Shoemaker
A-Short Season	Yakima Bears	Northwest League	Tony Harris
Rookie	Great Falls Dodgers	Pioneer League	Dino Ebel
Rookie	DSL Dodgers; DSL Dodgers 2	Dominican Summer League	

== Major League Baseball draft ==
The Dodgers selected 50 players in this draft. Of those, only four of them would eventually play Major League baseball.

The first round pick was outfielder Bubba Crosby from Rice University. He played nine games for the Dodgers before he was traded to the New York Yankees, where he was a part-time player for three seasons. He hit .216 in 205 games in the Majors.

This draft also included pitcher Scott Proctor (5th round) from Florida State University and catcher David Ross (7th round) from the University of Florida. Proctor was a relief pitcher in the Majors, who played in seven seasons (two for the Dodgers) and was 18-16 with a 4.78 ERA in 307 games (most prominently with the New York Yankees). Ross was primarily a backup catcher during his two decade career which began in 2002 and ended in 2016.

1998 draft picks

Round	Name	Position	School	Signed	Career span	Highest level
1	Bubba Crosby	OF	Rice University	Yes	1998–2007	MLB
2	Mike Fischer	RHP	University of South Alabama	Yes	1998–2002	AA
3	Alex Santos	RHP	University of Miami	No; Devil Rays-2000	2000–2006	AAA
4	Eric Riggs	SS	University of Central Florida	Yes	1998–2007	AAA
5	Scott Proctor	RHP	Florida State University	Yes	1998–2013	MLB
6	Ryan Moskau	RHP	University of Arizona	Yes	1998–2001	AA
7	David Ross	C	University of Florida	Yes	1998–2016	MLB
8	Thomari Story-Harden	1B	El Cerrito High School	Yes	1998–2006	A+
9	Joel Williams	RHP	Yoncalla High School	Yes	1998–1999	A-
10	Lance Caraccioli	LHP	University of Louisiana at Monroe	Yes	1998–2005	AAA
11	Christian Bridenbaugh	LHP	Central High School	Yes	1998–2001	A+
12	J. K. Taylor	RHP	Louisa County High School	Yes	1998	Rookie
13	C J Thomas	OF	McLane High School	Yes	1998–2003	A+
14	Robb Gorr	1B	University of Southern California	Yes	1998–2001	AAA
15	Paul Avery	LHP	Pepperdine University	Yes	1998–2002	A+
16	Jim Goelz	SS	New York City College of Technology	Yes	1998–2006	AAA
17	Alex Piedra	RHP	Miami Southern High School	Yes	1998–1999	Rookie
18	Tony Richards	C	North Dakota State University	No	1999–2009	Ind
19	Jeremiah Meccage	RHP	University of Iowa	No		
20	Tim Harrell	RHP	Liberty University	Yes	1998–2002	AA
21	Jacob Sampson	SS	Curtis High School	Yes	1998–2000	A-
22	Tony Gomes	RHP	San Joaquin Delta College	Yes	1998–2003	AA
23	Jason Moody	LHP	Spartanburg Methodist College	Yes	1998–2012	A-
24	Allen Davis	LHP	Northwestern State University of Louisiana	Yes	1998–2007	AAA
25	Scott Barnsby	RHP	University of Massachusetts Amherst	Yes	1998–1999	A+
26	Matt Greer	C	Louisiana Tech University	Yes	1998	A-
27	Nick Theodorou	2B	University of California, Los Angeles	Yes	1998–2005	AAA
28	Corry Parrott	OF	Pasadena City College	No; Brewers-2001	2001	Rookie
29	David Baum	LHP	Martin County High School	No; Pirates-2000	2000	A-
30	Lloyd Turner	SS	Hephzibah High School	No; Athletics-2002	2002–2012	AAA
31	Paul Brown	LHP	Citrus College	No; Reds-1999	1999–2000	A
32	Darren Heal	C	Indian River Community College	No; Blue Jays-2001	2001	Rookie
33	Herman Dean	OF	Monrovia High School	No; Tigers-2001	2001–2003	A
34	Carlos Claudio	SS	Ora Wilma High School	No		
35	Rashad Parker	SS	Crossroads School for Arts & Sciences	No; Mets-2002	2002–2004	A+
36	Curt Borland	RHP	Centaurus High School	No		
37	Joshua McMillen	OF	West Virginia University	No; Blue Jays-1998	1998–2001	AAA
38	Joshua Berndt	LHP	Oshkosh West High School	No		
39	Marc-Andre Lagace	LHP	Louis Riel High School	No		
40	Clint Hosford	RHP	Carson Graham High School	Yes	1999–2006	A+
41	Douglas Vandecaveye	3B	Tilbury District High School	No		
42	Jahseam George	LHP	College of the Sequoias	No; Indians-2002	2002	A-
43	Jorge Roman	RHP	José de Diego High School	No		-
44	Edward Hart	C	Grayson County High School	No		
45	Brandon Smith	1B	Cypress College	No		
46	Steve Andrade	RHP	American River High School	No; Angels-2001	2001–2009	MLB
47	Henry Arocho	OF	Benito Cerezo High School	No		
48	Chad Merchand	RHP	Lethbridge High School	No		
49	Wayne Stone	3B	A. B. Miller High School	No		
50	Blake McGinley	LHP	Bakersfield High School	No; Mets-2001	2001–2007	AAA
