= 1999 Los Angeles Dodgers season =

1999 Los Angeles Dodgers
- League: National League
- Division: West
- Ballpark: Dodger Stadium
- City: Los Angeles
- Record: 77–85 (.475)
- Divisional place: 3rd
- Owners: Fox Entertainment Group
- President: Bob Graziano
- General managers: Kevin Malone
- Managers: Davey Johnson
- Television: Fox Sports West 2; KTLA (5)
- Radio: XTRA Sports 1150; Vin Scully, Ross Porter, Rick Monday; KWKW; Jaime Jarrín, Pepe Yñiguez

The 1999 Los Angeles Dodgers season was the 110th for the franchise in Major League Baseball, and their 42nd season in Los Angeles, California. The season started with a new management team; Kevin Malone became the team's General Manager and Davey Johnson was selected to be the new Dodgers Manager. Looking to make a splash, Malone exclaimed "There is a new Sheriff in town" as he took over the reins and made a splash by signing starting pitcher Kevin Brown to a huge long contract. However, the team struggled to a third-place finish in the National League West.

== Offseason ==
- October 12, 1998: Acquired Scott Prouty from the Seattle Mariners for Eric Weaver.
- November 11, 1998: Acquired Mel Rojas from the New York Mets for Bobby Bonilla.
- December 1, 1998: Acquired Todd Hundley and Arnold Gooch from the New York Mets for Charles Johnson and Roger Cedeño.
- January 11, 1999: Doug Bochtler was released by the Dodgers.
- January 12, 1999: Acquired Joe Sutton from the Chicago White Sox for Darren Hall.

== Regular season ==
=== Season standings ===
NL West
Team	W	L	Pct.	GB	Home	Road
Arizona Diamondbacks	100	62	.617	—	52‍–‍29	48‍–‍33
San Francisco Giants	86	76	.531	14	49‍–‍32	37‍–‍44
Los Angeles Dodgers	77	85	.475	23	37‍–‍44	40‍–‍41
San Diego Padres	74	88	.457	26	46‍–‍35	28‍–‍53
Colorado Rockies	72	90	.444	28	39‍–‍42	33‍–‍48

=== Record vs. opponents ===
1999 National League record Source: MLB Standings Grid – 1999
Team	AZ	ATL	CHC	CIN	COL	FLA	HOU	LAD	MIL	MON	NYM	PHI	PIT	SD	SF	STL	AL
Arizona	—	4–5	7–2	1–8	6–7	8–1	5–4	7–6	5–4	6–3	7–2	8–1	5–2	11–2	9–3	4–4	7–8
Atlanta	5–4	—	2–5	8–1	5–4	9–4	6–1	5–4	5–2	9–4	9–3	8–5	6–3	5–4	4–5	8–1	9–9
Chicago	2–7	5–2	—	5–8	4–5	6–3	3–9	2–7	6–6	2–5	3–6	2–7	7–6	6–3	1–7	7–5	6–9
Cincinnati	8–1	1–8	8–5	—	7–2	6–1	9–4	4–3	6–6	4–3	5–5	6–3	7–6	6–3	4–5	8–4	7–8
Colorado	7–6	4–5	5–4	2–7	—	5–4	2–6	8–5	6–3	6–3	4–5	5–4	2–7	4–9	4–9	4–5	4–8
Florida	1–8	4–9	3–6	1–6	4–5	—	2–7	7–2	5–4	8–4	3–10	2–11	3–4	3–6	4–5	3–4	11–7
Houston	4–5	1–6	9–3	4–9	6–2	7–2	—	6–3	8–5	7–2	4–5	6–1	5–7	8–1	5–4	5–7	12–3
Los Angeles	6–7	4–5	7–2	3–4	5–8	2–7	3–6	—	7–2	5–4	4–4	6–3	3–6	3–9	8–5	3–6	8–7
Milwaukee	4–5	2–5	6–6	6–6	3–6	4–5	5–8	2–7	—	5–4	2–5	5–4	8–4	3–5	4–5	7–6	8–6
Montreal	3–6	4–9	5–2	3–4	3–6	4–8	2–7	4–5	4–5	—	5–8	6–6	3–6	5–3	4–5	5–4	8–10
New York	2–7	3–9	6–3	5–5	5–4	10–3	5–4	4–4	5–2	8–5	—	6–6	7–2	7–2	7–2	5–2	12–6
Philadelphia	1–8	5–8	7–2	3–6	4–5	11–2	1–6	3–6	4–5	6–6	6–6	—	3–4	6–3	2–6	4–5	11–7
Pittsburgh	2–5	3–6	6–7	6–7	7–2	4–3	7–5	6–3	4–8	6–3	2–7	4–3	—	3–6	4–5	7–5	7–8
San Diego	2–11	4–5	3–6	3–6	9–4	6–3	1–8	9–3	5–3	3–5	2–7	3–6	6–3	—	5–7	2–7	11–4
San Francisco	3–9	5–4	7–1	5–4	9–4	5–4	4–5	5–8	5–4	5–4	2–7	6–2	5–4	7–5	—	6–3	7–8
St. Louis	4–4	1–8	5–7	4–8	5–4	4–3	7–5	6–3	6–7	4–5	2–5	5–4	5–7	7–2	3–6	—	7–8

=== Opening Day lineup ===
Opening Day starters
Name	Position
Eric Young	Second baseman
Mark Grudzielanek	Shortstop
Gary Sheffield	Left fielder
Raúl Mondesí	Right fielder
Devon White	Center fielder
Eric Karros	First baseman
Todd Hundley	Catcher
Adrián Beltré	Third baseman
Kevin Brown	Starting pitcher

=== Notable transactions ===
- April 16, 1999: Acquired Robinson Checo, Apostol Garcia and Rick Roberts from the Detroit Tigers for Dave Mlicki and Mel Rojas.
- May 19, 1999: Acquired Doug Bochtler from the Toronto Blue Jays for cash.

=== Roster ===
1999 Los Angeles Dodgers
Roster
Pitchers: 52 Jamie Arnold; 46 Doug Bochtler; 50 Pedro Borbón, Jr.; 27 Kevin Brown; 36,56 Robinson Checo; 37 Darren Dreifort; 48 Éric Gagné; 49 Matt Herges; 60 Mike Judd; 45 Jeff Kubenka; 51 Mike Maddux; 55,70 Onan Masaoka; 75 Alan Mills; 38 Dave Mlicki; 13 Antonio Osuna; 61 Chan Ho Park; 33 Carlos Pérez; 51 Mel Rojas; 41 Jeff Shaw; 59 Ismael Valdez; 54 Jeff Williams	Catchers: 9 Todd Hundley; 16 Paul Lo Duca; 36 Ángel Peña; 89 Rick Wilkins; Infielders: 29 Adrián Beltré; 17 Juan Castro; 3 Alex Cora; 30 Craig Counsell; 7 Tripp Cromer; 8 Mark Grudzielanek; 25 Dave Hansen; 23 Eric Karros; 54 Chance Sanford; 5 José Vizcaíno; 21 Eric Young	Outfielders: 48,94 Jacob Brumfield; 30 Brent Cookson; 28 Todd Hollandsworth; 47 Trenidad Hubbard; 43 Raúl Mondesí; 10 Gary Sheffield; 22 Devon White	Manager: 15 Davey Johnson; Coaches: 26 Rick Dempsey (bullpen); 44 Rick Down (hitting); 35 Glenn Hoffman (third base); 49 Charlie Hough (pitching); 11 Manny Mota; 38 Claude Osteen (pitching); 31 John Shelby (1st base); 12 Jim Tracy (bench)

== Starting Pitchers stats ==
Note: G = Games pitched; GS = Games started; IP = Innings pitched; W/L = Wins/Losses; ERA = Earned run average; BB = Walks allowed; SO = Strikeouts; CG = Complete games

Name	G	GS	IP	W/L	ERA	BB	SO	CG
Kevin Brown	35	35	252.1	13-6	3.00	59	221	5
Ismael Valdez	32	32	203.1	9-14	3.98	58	143	2
Chan Ho Park	33	33	194.1	12-11	5.23	100	174	0
Darren Dreifort	30	29	178.2	13-13	4.79	76	140	1
Carlos Perez	17	16	89.2	2-10	7.43	39	40	0
Éric Gagné	5	5	30.0	1-1	2.10	15	30	0
Mike Judd	7	4	28.0	3-1	5.46	12	22	0
Jeff Williams	5	3	17.2	2-0	4.08	9	7	0

== Relief Pitchers stats ==
Note: G = Games pitched; GS = Games started; IP = Innings pitched; W/L = Wins/Losses; ERA = Earned run average; BB = Walks allowed; SO = Strikeouts; SV = Saves

Name	G	GS	IP	W/L	ERA	BB	SO	SV
Jeff Shaw	64	0	68.0	2-4	2.78	15	43	34
Pedro Borbón, Jr.	70	0	50.2	4-3	4.09	29	33	1
Alan Mills	68	0	72.2	3-4	3.73	43	49	0
Onan Masaoka	54	0	66.2	2-4	4.32	47	61	1
Mike Maddux	49	0	54.2	1-1	3.29	19	41	0
Jamie Arnold	36	3	69.0	2-4	5.48	34	26	1
Matt Herges	17	0	24.1	0-2	4.07	8	18	0
Robinson Checo	9	2	15.2	2-2	10.34	13	11	0
Doug Bochtler	12	0	13.0	0-0	5.54	6	7	0
Jeff Kubenka	6	0	7.2	0-1	11.74	4	2	0
Dave Mlicki	2	0	7.1	0-1	4.91	2	1	0
Mel Rojas	5	0	5.0	0-0	12.60	3	3	0
Antonio Osuna	5	0	4.2	0-0	7.71	3	5	0

== Batting Stats ==
Note: Pos = Position; G = Games played; AB = At bats; Avg. = Batting average; R = Runs scored; H = Hits; HR = Home runs; RBI = Runs batted in; SB = Stolen bases

Name	Pos	G	AB	Avg.	R	H	HR	RBI	SB
Todd Hundley	C	114	376	.207	49	78	24	55	3
Ángel Peña	C	43	120	.208	14	25	4	21	0
Paul Lo Duca	C	36	95	.232	11	22	3	11	1
Rick Wilkins	C	3	4	.000	0	0	0	0	0
Eric Karros	1B	153	578	.304	74	176	34	112	8
Eric Young	2B	119	456	.281	73	128	2	41	51
Mark Grudzielanek	SS	123	488	.326	72	159	7	46	6
Adrián Beltré	3B	152	538	.275	84	148	15	67	18
José Vizcaíno	SS/3B/2B/LF	94	266	.252	27	67	1	29	2
Craig Counsell	2B/SS	50	108	.259	20	28	0	9	1
Dave Hansen	1B/3B/RF	100	107	.252	14	27	2	17	0
Tripp Cromer	IF/OF	33	52	.192	5	10	2	8	0
Alex Cora	SS/2B	11	30	.167	2	5	0	3	0
Chance Sanford	2B	5	8	.250	1	2	0	2	0
Juan Castro	2B/SS	2	1	.000	0	0	0	0	0
Raúl Mondesí	RF/CF	159	601	.253	98	152	33	99	36
Devon White	CF	134	474	.268	60	127	14	68	19
Gary Sheffield	LF	152	549	.301	103	165	34	101	11
Todd Hollandsworth	CF/LF/RF	92	261	.284	39	74	9	32	5
Trenidad Hubbard	CF/LF/RF/2B/C	82	105	.314	23	33	1	13	4
Jacob Brumfield	CF/LF	18	17	.294	4	5	0	1	0
Brent Cookson	LF/RF	3	5	.200	0	1	0	0	0

== 1999 Awards ==
- 1999 Major League Baseball All-Star Game
  - Gary Sheffield reserve
- NL Player of the Week
  - Raúl Mondesí (April 5–11)
  - Eric Karros (Sep. 20–26)

== Farm system ==
Level	Team	League	Manager
AAA	Albuquerque Dukes	Pacific Coast League	Mike Scioscia
AA	San Antonio Missions	Texas League	Jimmy Johnson
High A	San Bernardino Stampede	California League	Rick Burleson
High A	Vero Beach Dodgers	Florida State League	Álvaro Espinoza
A-Short Season	Yakima Bears	Northwest League	Dino Ebel
Rookie	Great Falls Dodgers	Pioneer League	Tony Harris
Rookie	DSL Dodgers; DSL Dodgers 2	Dominican Summer League	

== Major League Baseball draft ==
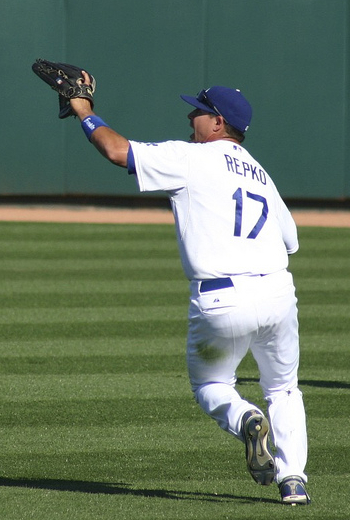
Jason Repko

The Dodgers selected 50 players in this draft. Of those, seven of them would eventually play Major League baseball. They lost their first round pick to the San Diego Padres and their third round pick to the Baltimore Orioles as a result of their signing free agent pitchers Kevin Brown and Alan Mills. They also gained a supplemental first round pick and a second round pick as compensation for losing pitcher Scott Radinsky to free agency and a supplemental second round pick as compensation for pitcher Brian Bohanon.

The first round pick was shortstop Jason Repko from Hanford High School. He was transitioned to the outfield and played seven seasons in the majors (four with the Dodgers). He had several serious injuries in his career and was relegated primarily to a backup position. Repko hit .224 in 360 MLB games. The draft class also included outfielder Shane Victorino, who was drafted in the sixth round out of St. Anthony High School in Hawaii. He was selected by the Philadelphia Phillies in the 2004 Rule 5 draft and proceeded to become a two-time All-Star and two-time World Series champion.

1999 draft picks

Round	Name	Position	School	Signed	Career span	Highest level
1s	Jason Repko	SS	Hanford High School	Yes	1999–2016	MLB
2	Brennan King	SS	Oakland High School	Yes	1999–2008	AAA
2s	Drew Meyer	SS	Bishop England High School	No; Rangers-2002	2002–2010	MLB
4	Joe Thurston	SS	Sacramento City College	Yes	1999–2014	MLB
5	Phil Devey	LHP	University of Louisiana at Lafayette	Yes	1999–2005	AAA
6	Shane Victorino	OF	St. Anthony High School	Yes	1999–2015	MLB
7	Jose Escalera	OF	Carlos Escobar Lopez High School	Yes	1999–2002	A
8	T. J. Nail	RHP	Schaumburg High School	Yes	1999–2008	AAA
9	Jon Berry	RHP	Newberry College	Yes	1999–2003	A+
10	Lamont Matthews	OF	Oklahoma State University	Yes	1999–2003	AAA
11	Eric Junge	RHP	Bucknell University	Yes	1999–2012	MLB
12	Josh Dalton	SS	Louisiana State University	Yes	1999	A-
13	Jonathan Hale	C	Missouri State University	No		
14	Randy Hadden	RHP	University of South Carolina	Yes	1999–2001	A+
15	Wade Parrish	LHP	Washington State University	Yes	1999–2003	AAA
16	Tymber Lee	RHP	Wichita State University	No; Angels-2000	2000–2002	A-
17	Scott Martin	RHP	Central Connecticut State University	Yes	1999–2002	A+
18	John Rozich	C	Kutztown University of Pennsylvania	Yes	1999	A-
19	Harold Eckert	RHP	Florida International University	No; Mets-2001	2001–2009	AAA
20	Ryan Hamilton	RHP	University of California, San Diego	No; Astros-2000	2000–2001	A-
21	Chris Snow	OF	Desert Vista High School	Yes	1999	Rookie
22	Tim Cunningham	LHP	Rocklin High School	No; Rangers-2003	2003–2004	A
23	Reggie Abercrombie	OF	Columbus High School	Yes	2000–2019	MLB
24	Shane Nance	LHP	University of Houston	Yes	2000–2005	MLB
25	Clint Chauncey	C	Terry Parker High School	No; Yankees-2000	2000–2007	AA
26	Traviss Hodge	1B	Los Angeles Pierce College	No		
27	Luke Robertson	RHP	Butler County Community College	No; Athletics-2002	2002–2014	AAA
28	Mike Keristead	RHP	St. Malachy's High School	Yes	2000–2003	A+
29	Zach Cates	1B	Mesa Community College	No; Cardinals-2002	2002–2004	A+
30	Ryan Brnardic	RHP	Sandwich Secondary School	No; Orioles-2003	2003–2008	Rookie
31	Justin Glenn	OF	Sheridan High School	No		
32	Nolan McManus	RHP	Sierra College	No		
33	Cliff Wren	C	Mississippi State University	Yes	1999–2003	A+
34	Norm Siriveaw	OF	East Oklahoma State College	No; Blue Jays-2000	2000–2003	A
35	Kegan O'Toole	C	Henry M. Jackson High School	No		
36	Ryan Harris	RHP	Woodstock High School	No		
37	Miguel Heredia	RHP	East Oklahoma State College	No		
38	Chris Hunter	RHP	Mountain View High School	No; Angels -2004	2004–2008	AAA
39	Christopher Hanne	LHP	Duluth High School	No		
40	Michael Pelsnik	RHP	Horizon High School	No		
41	Keith Godbolt	OF	Hillsborough High School	Yes	1999–2000	Rookie
42	Rob Harrand	RHP		No; Phillies-2002	2002–2003	A-
43	Kyle Bateman	RHP	Coconino High School	No		-
44	Robert Sumner	1B	Pace High School	No		
45	Erik Lohse	RHP	Butte College	No; Twins-2001	2001–2005	AA
46	Chris Bell	RHP	Christopher Columbus High School	No; Reds-2002	2002	Rookie
47	Joey Black	RHP	Bonneville High School	No		
48	Scott Wilson	C	Ellensburg High School	No		
49	Jayson Casiano	1B	Monserrate Leon High School	No		
50	Jonathan Morel	1B	Colegio San Agustin High School	No		
