= Fred Claire =

American Major League Baseball executive (1935–2026)

- Claire in 2016
- Born: October 5, 1935; Jamestown, Ohio, U.S.
- Died: October 5, 2026 (aged 91); Pasadena, California, U.S.
- Education: San Jose State University; El Camino College
- Occupation: Baseball executive
- Spouse: Sheryl Claire
- Baseball career

Teams
- As general manager: Los Angeles Dodgers (1987–1998)

Career highlights and awards
- World Series champion (1988); Sporting News Executive of the Year (1988)

Fred Claire (October 5, 1935 – October 5, 2026) was an American Major League Baseball (MLB) executive who served in numerous roles for the Los Angeles Dodgers from 1969 to 1998 including the role of general manager from 1987 to 1998.

== Early life ==
Claire was born in Jamestown, Ohio on October 5, 1935. His father owned and operated a drugstore. Claire has one brother and a sister. In 1950, Marston and Mary Francis Claire moved their family to Torrance, California, a suburb of Los Angeles. Fred graduated from Torrance High School, then obtained his bachelor's degree in journalism from San Jose State University. He holds an Associate of Arts degree from Mt. San Antonio College and has been honored by the college as an outstanding alumnus. He also attended El Camino College, located in Torrance. While at El Camino, he had a paper published in Baseball Magazine called "Make Way for the Coast League" which discussed baseball on the west coast and turning the Pacific Coast League into a Major League.

Throughout the late 1950s and 1960s, Claire worked as a sports editor/sports writer for the Whittier Daily News, the Pomona Progress-Bulletin, and the Long Beach Independent Press-Telegram. He married and had three children, Jen, Jeff, and Kim.

== Dodgers Public Relations executive ==
In the spring of 1969, Claire was assigned to cover the Dodgers during spring training in Vero Beach, Florida, for the Press-Telegram. During the season, one of the assistants in the public relations department for the Dodgers was fired. Claire expressed his interest in the position to Dodger executives and was hired in July 1969. He worked in that same position until 1975 when his boss, Dodgers vice president of public relations, Red Patterson, left to work for the California Angels. Claire moved into Patterson's position. During his time as VP of Public Relations, he was instrumental in creating the branding that came to be known as "Dodger blue" and the subsequent "Think Blue" campaign and also the hiring of announcer Ross Porter. Porter would remain a Dodger announcer from 1977 until 2004.

== Dodgers general manager ==
On April 6, 1987, Dodgers General Manager Al Campanis accepted the offer to appear on ABC's news program Nightline to talk about his thoughts on the 40th anniversary of Jackie Robinson breaking the color barrier. Campanis did not alert anyone in the Dodgers organization that he would be on the show. When asked why more African-Americans had not become baseball managers or executives, he stated, "I truly believe they may not have some of the necessities to be, let's say, a field manager, or perhaps, a general manager. Why are black people not good swimmers? Because they don't have buoyancy." These comments stunned the baseball world. Campanis, who did not have a reputation as a racist and was one of the few Dodger players to welcome Robinson during his debut, was forced to resign his post with the Dodgers 48 hours after the program's airing with Claire assuming player personnel responsibilities.

Dodgers president Peter O'Malley moved Claire into the general manager position. After a dismal 1987 season, Claire rebuilt the team into an instant playoff contender. During the offseason before the 1988 season, Claire acquired veteran outfielders Kirk Gibson and Mike Davis, veteran shortstop Alfredo Griffin, and pitchers Jay Howell and Jesse Orosco. The Dodgers would go on to win the 1988 World Series against the heavily favored Oakland Athletics in just five games.

His later moves were not as successful. On November 8, 1990, the Dodgers gave free agent outfielder Darryl Strawberry a five-year contract worth $20 million. At the time it looked like a good deal. Strawberry hit 37 home runs with a .277 batting average in 1989 for the New York Mets. However, Strawberry's time with the Dodgers was characterized by chronic back problems, drug abuse and overall underachievement.

The following year, on November 27, 1991, Claire traded pitchers Tim Belcher and John Wetteland to the Cincinnati Reds for outfielder Eric Davis and pitcher Kip Gross. It was supposed to set up a reunion of childhood friends Strawberry and Davis. However, Davis was also plagued by injuries throughout his less than 2-year stint with the Dodgers. He was traded to the Detroit Tigers in August 1993. Wetteland, was traded from the Reds to the Montreal Expos less than a month after he had joined the Reds. Wetteland went on to become one of the most dominating relief pitchers in MLB throughout the rest of the 1990s. Darryl Strawberry was given his outright release on May 26, 1994, after he failed to show up to a game.

The transaction even Claire would later regret occurred in 1994. In need of a second baseman after a contract dispute with Jody Reed, Claire sent the talented Pedro Martínez to Montreal for Delino DeShields. Martinez became one of the best pitchers in MLB for the next decade and a half. Martinez was selected to 8 All Star teams and won the Cy Young Award in 1997, 1999 and 2000 and, eventually, was inducted into the National Baseball Hall of Fame. Deshields spent three years as the Dodgers starting second baseman in which he was more known for his various injuries and numerous complaints that the Dodgers did not have enough black players on the team.

== FOX takeover/Claire's removal ==
Claire continued as the Dodger general manager through the 1997 season. When Rupert Murdoch's News Corporation, owner of the Fox network and 20th Century Fox purchased the team from the O'Malleys in 1998, officials stated that Claire and field manager Bill Russell would remain in their positions. On May 15, 1998, new Dodger officials made a blockbuster trade without the involvement or knowledge of general manager Claire, a move that was unheard of in baseball at the time. The trade was one of the biggest in Dodger history. The Dodgers traded Mike Piazza and Todd Zeile to the Florida Marlins for Gary Sheffield, Charles Johnson, Jim Eisenreich and Bobby Bonilla. Claire was furious that the new FOX officials would make such a deal as Piazza had been with the organization for over a decade and Zeile had signed for less than market value to be closer to his home in suburban Santa Clarita. Claire, who had full control of player transactions before FOX took over, pulled no punches when he was asked his feeling on the trade. On June 21, 1998, Claire and Russell were both relieved of their duties in what was deemed by those in baseball as the "Sunday Night Massacre." Russell was replaced by Glenn Hoffman as manager, and Claire by Tommy Lasorda as the general manager.

== Death ==
Claire died on October 5, 2026, his 91st birthday.

== Record as general manager ==
Team	Year	Regular season					Postseason			
Team	Year	Games	Won	Lost	Win %	Finish	Won	Lost	Win %	Result
LAD	1987	159	73	86	.459	4th in NL West	–	–	–	–
LAD	1988	162	94	67	.584	1st in NL West	8	4	.667	Won World Series (OAK)
LAD	1989	160	77	83	.481	4th in NL West	–	–	–	–
LAD	1990	162	86	76	.531	2nd in NL West	–	–	–	–
LAD	1991	162	93	69	.574	2nd in NL West	–	–	–	–
LAD	1992	162	63	99	.389	6th in NL West	–	–	–	–
LAD	1993	162	81	81	.500	4th in NL West	–	–	–	–
LAD	1994	114	58	56	.509	1st in NL West	Postseason cancelled			
LAD	1995	144	78	66	.542	1st in NL West	0	3	.000	Lost NLDS (CIN)
LAD	1996	162	90	72	.556	2nd in NL West	0	3	.000	Lost NLDS (ATL)
LAD	1997	162	88	74	.543	2nd in NL West	–	–	–	–
LAD	1998	82	40	42	.488	(fired)	–	–	–	–
Total		1,793	921	871	.514		8	10	.444	

Awards
Preceded by Al Rosen	Sporting News Major League Baseball Executive of the Year; 1988	Succeeded by Roland Hemond
Sporting positions
Preceded by Al Campanis	Los Angeles Dodgers General Manager; 1987–1998	Succeeded by Tommy Lasorda
