= Tic Talk =

Book by Dylan Peters

Tic Talk: Living with Tourette Syndrome
- Author: Dylan Peters
- Illustrator: Zachary Wendland and Kris Taft Miller
- Language: English
- Subject: Tourette syndrome in children
- Genre: Juvenile literature
- Published: 2007 (Little Five Star)
- Publication place: United States
- Pages: 50 pages
- Awards: National Parenting Publications Awards (NAPPA) Book Award 2007
- ISBN: 1589850513
- OCLC: 70884973

Tic Talk: Living with Tourette Syndrome is a children's non-fiction book written by Dylan Peters, a nine-year-old boy with Tourette syndrome (T.S.). In this personal narrative, Peters gives a chronology of events from his T.S. diagnosis to when he tells his friends and classmates he has TS.

== Overview ==
Peters introduces himself by telling the reader how old he is and about his family. To delve further into his personality he states what sports and school subjects he likes most. When he was four years old he began to have tics, and his parents took him to a neurologist who prescribed medicine which would help reduce the intensity of the tics. The tics still occurred with medication. As the tics progressed in strength and intensity, Peters began to wonder if his friends would notice and if they would think he was strange. His friends began to ask questions about why he would do certain things such as blink twice or jerk his head. In the third grade, he decided to tell his friends and classmates of his Tourette syndrome. As the date of getting in front of his class to tell of his syndrome approached, his tics worsened. The day came and his mother went in to define Tourette syndrome for the class. Dylan then told his friends of his story so they could better understand him. After he did this his tics decreased in intensity. In the end he stated that this was most likely because he was not scared or nervous about what his friends would think anymore. In his last paragraph, Peters stated that having Tourette syndrome doesn't change one, it just makes one who one is as a part of one's personality.

== Reviews ==
The narrative starts with a foreword by former Major League Baseball player, Jim Eisenreich. Like Peters, Eisenreich grew up with Tourette syndrome; he commends Peters for writing his own narrative at such a young age and refers to the narrative as a "masterpiece".

According to the Canadian Family Physician:

Through simple, straightforward writing and child-oriented illustrations by buddy Zachary Wendland, Dylan Peters has created an appealing "storybook" resource for other kids. The title of the book pretty much explains what the book is about. The book is a useful tool for elementary-level students and their parents and teachers.

The book won a National Parenting Publications Awards (N.A.P.P.A.) for books ages six and up.
