= Adrián Beltré =

Dominican baseball player (born 1979)

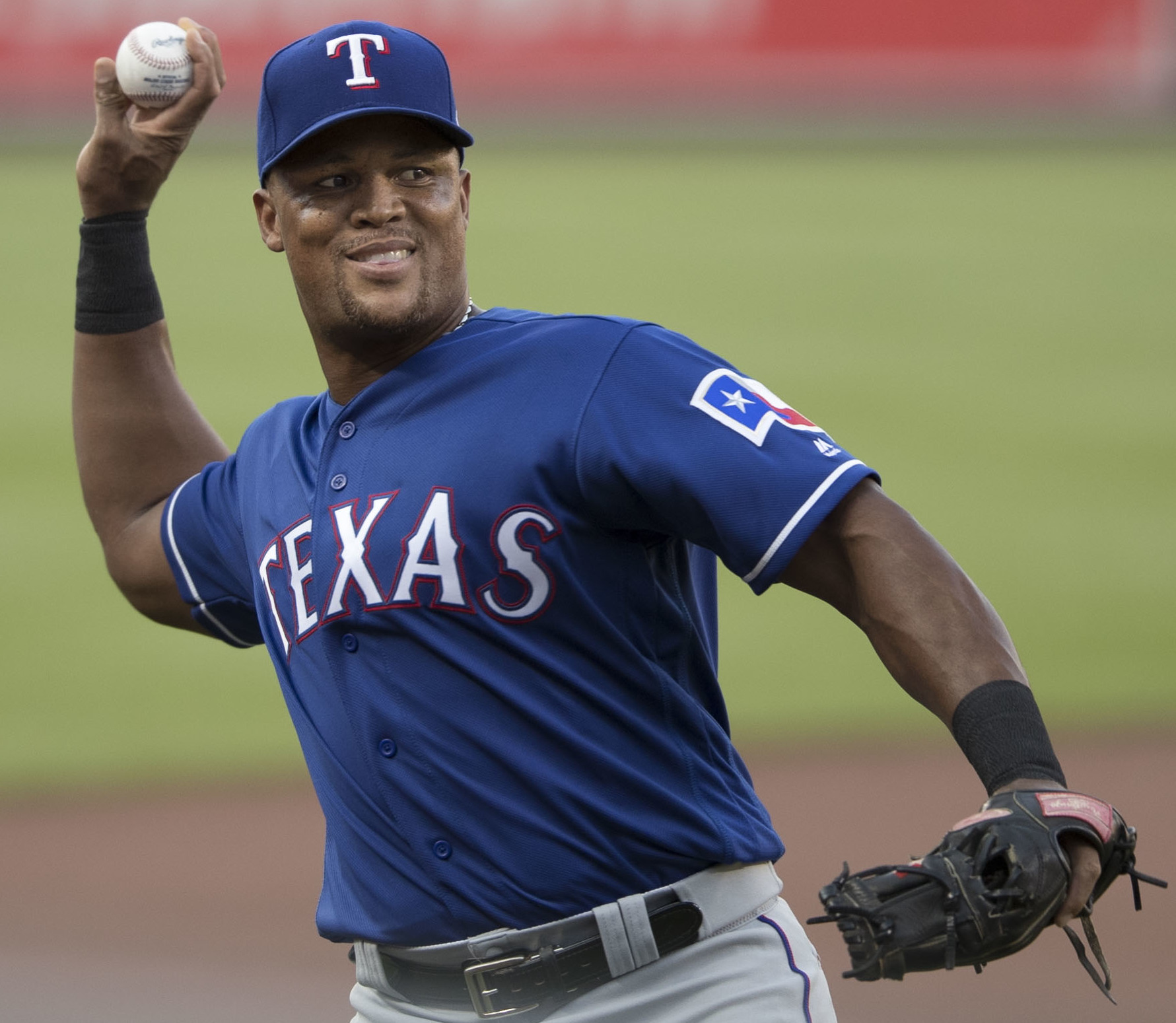
- Beltré with the Texas Rangers in 2017
- Third baseman
- Born: April 7, 1979 (age 47); Santo Domingo, Dominican Republic
- Batted: Right Threw: Right

MLB debut
- June 24, 1998, for the Los Angeles Dodgers

Last MLB appearance
- September 30, 2018, for the Texas Rangers

MLB statistics
- Batting average: .286
- Hits: 3,166
- Home runs: 477
- Runs batted in: 1,707
- Stats at Baseball Reference

Teams
- Los Angeles Dodgers (1998–2004); Seattle Mariners (2005–2009); Boston Red Sox (2010); Texas Rangers (2011–2018)

Career highlights and awards
- 4× All-Star (2010–2012, 2014); 5× Gold Glove Award (2007, 2008, 2011, 2012, 2016); 4× Silver Slugger Award (2004, 2010, 2011, 2014); NL home run leader (2004); Texas Rangers No. 29 retired; Texas Rangers Hall of Fame

Member of the National

Baseball Hall of Fame
- Induction: 2024
- Vote: 95.1% (first ballot)

Adrián Beltré Pérez (born April 7, 1979) is a Dominican former professional baseball third baseman. Beltré played for the Los Angeles Dodgers, Seattle Mariners, Boston Red Sox, and Texas Rangers in Major League Baseball (MLB). He is regarded as one of the greatest third basemen of all time.

Beltré made his MLB debut with the Dodgers in 1998 at age 19. He led the majors with 48 home runs with the Dodgers in 2004, was the team MVP of the Red Sox in 2010, played in the 2011 World Series for the Rangers, and tied for the major league lead in hits in 2013. On September 19, 2014, Beltré surpassed Vladimir Guerrero as the all-time MLB leader for hits by a Dominican player, a record since broken by Albert Pujols in 2019. On July 30, 2017, Beltré became the 31st player in MLB history to reach 3,000 hits and the first Dominican player to achieve that milestone. Beltré retired following the 2018 season with 3,166 career hits (most by a third baseman in MLB history), 477 home runs, and 1,707 runs batted in. He hit for the cycle three times, in 2008, 2012, and 2015, one of five players to do so in MLB history.

Having played 21 major league seasons and won the Gold Glove Award five times, Beltré is notable for his defensive prowess and career longevity as well as his power hitting. He played in four MLB All-Star Games and won the Silver Slugger Award four times. Upon his retirement, Beltré was the only third baseman in history with both 3,000 career hits and 400 home runs. According to Baseball Reference, Beltré has the third-highest Wins Above Replacement among third basemen. He retired as the all-time leader amongst third basemen in hits and RBIs, and ranked third in home runs at the position. He is the fifth major-leaguer to have hit at least 100 home runs for three different teams. In 2024, Beltré was inducted into the Baseball Hall of Fame in his first year of eligibility.

== Early life ==
Beltré was born on April 7, 1979, in Santo Domingo, Dominican Republic. He attended Liceo Máximo Gómez High School.

While working out at Campo Las Palmas in 1994, a Los Angeles Dodgers facility — one of the first of its kind for a Major League Baseball (MLB) team in the Dominican Republic — Beltré was spotted by scouts Ralph Avila and Pablo Peguero. Though only 15 years old and weighing 130 lb (59 kg), Beltré featured a quick swing and live throwing arm. On the insistence of Avila and Peguero, the Dodgers signed him in July 1994 with a $23,000 signing bonus.

== Professional career ==
=== Los Angeles Dodgers (1998–2004) ===
Beltré was a highly touted prospect when he began his major league career. After being called up to the majors from the then-Dodgers' Double-A affiliate San Antonio Missions, Beltré made his major league debut on June 24, 1998, starting at third base in the first game of an interleague series against the Anaheim Angels. At the time, he was the youngest player in the National League (NL). During his first at-bat, Beltré hit a two-out run batted in (RBI) double off Angels starter Chuck Finley into left field to score Paul Konerko from second base to tie the game. Beltré hit his first home run six days later against Texas Rangers starter Rick Helling. At the end of the 1998 season, Beltré finished with 13 errors at third base while batting .215 with seven home runs.

At one point in the spring training prior to the start of the 1999 season, Beltré's agent, Scott Boras, commented to him that "he couldn't believe" his relatively rapid ascent to the majors and handling of "such a difficult position like third base" at age 20. Beltré replied that he was 19 years old, not 20. Boras then realized that Beltré's date of birth in the Dodgers' records was incorrect and indicated the same to the team, but, that if they were to correct the mistake by compensating Beltré for signing him at younger than MLB's allowable age, they would no longer pursue the issue. Team personnel at Las Palmas denied Boras' assertion. As a result, Boras and Beltré went public. Boras convinced MLB commissioner Bud Selig to investigate the Dodgers, and MLB suspended their scouting operations in the Dominican Republic for one year, as well as Avila and Peguero. Dodgers general manager Fred Claire, whom MLB did not contact during their investigation, publicly expressed surprise and that he was unaware of the incident. Selig awarded Beltré $48,500 in damages.

In 2004, Beltré had a breakout season in which he established a number of career highs, including leading MLB with 48 home runs. Other career highs included batting .334, 200 hits, 121 RBI, 104 runs scored, .629 slugging percentage, and a then-career high 32 doubles. He finished second in voting for the NL Most Valuable Player Award (MVP) and was honored with his first career Silver Slugger Award and the Babe Ruth Home Run Award.

=== Seattle Mariners (2005–2009) ===
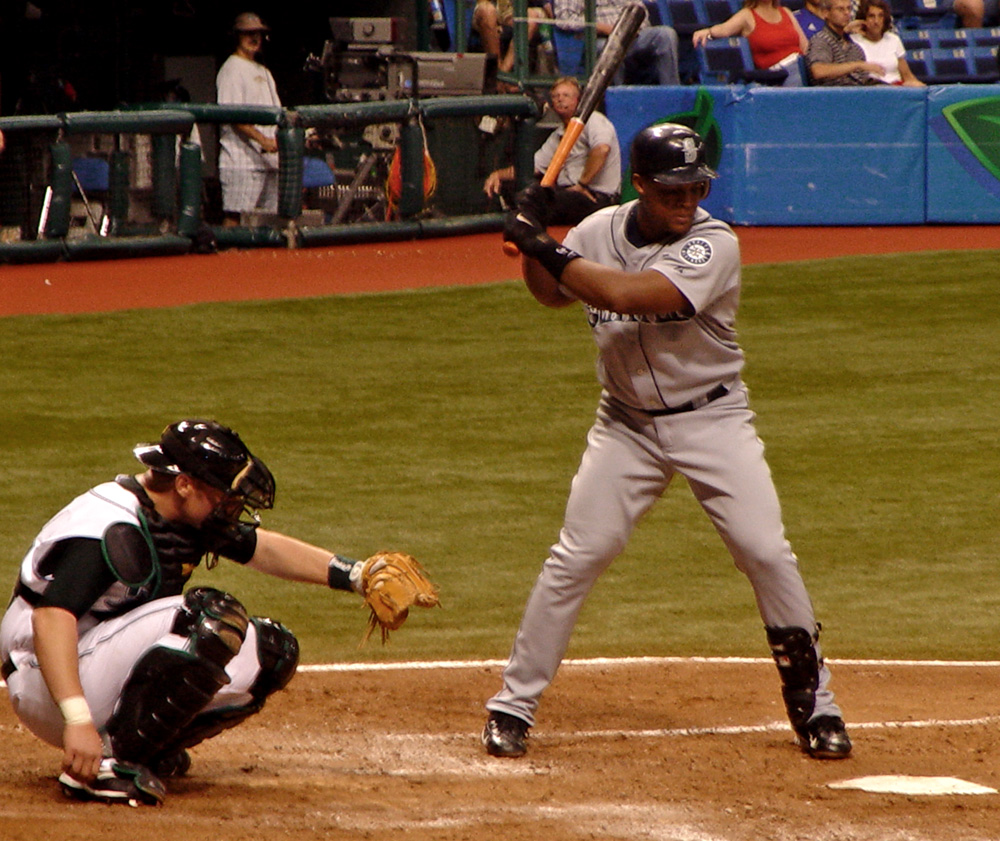
Beltré at bat for the Seattle Mariners in 2005

The Seattle Mariners signed Beltré as a free agent before the 2005 season to a five-year, $64 million deal. Regressing to his pre-2004 form, he batted just .255 with 19 home runs and 87 RBI. Manager Mike Hargrove said after the season that he thought Beltré was personally disappointed in his first season in Seattle.

After Beltré batted .167 through April 10, Ted Miller of the Seattle Post-Intelligencer wrote that he might become one of the Mariners' greatest busts. He hit his first home run on April 29, raising his average to .198, and continued to improve his performance, batting .281 with 24 home runs the rest of the season. On July 23, against the Boston Red Sox, Beltré hit an inside-the-park home run, the first one in Safeco Field history.

Though it was not a great season for Beltré, it was statistically his best as a Mariner. He hit .276 and had 26 home runs, 99 RBI, and 41 doubles. He also won a Fielding Bible Award for being the top MLB defensive third baseman during the year.

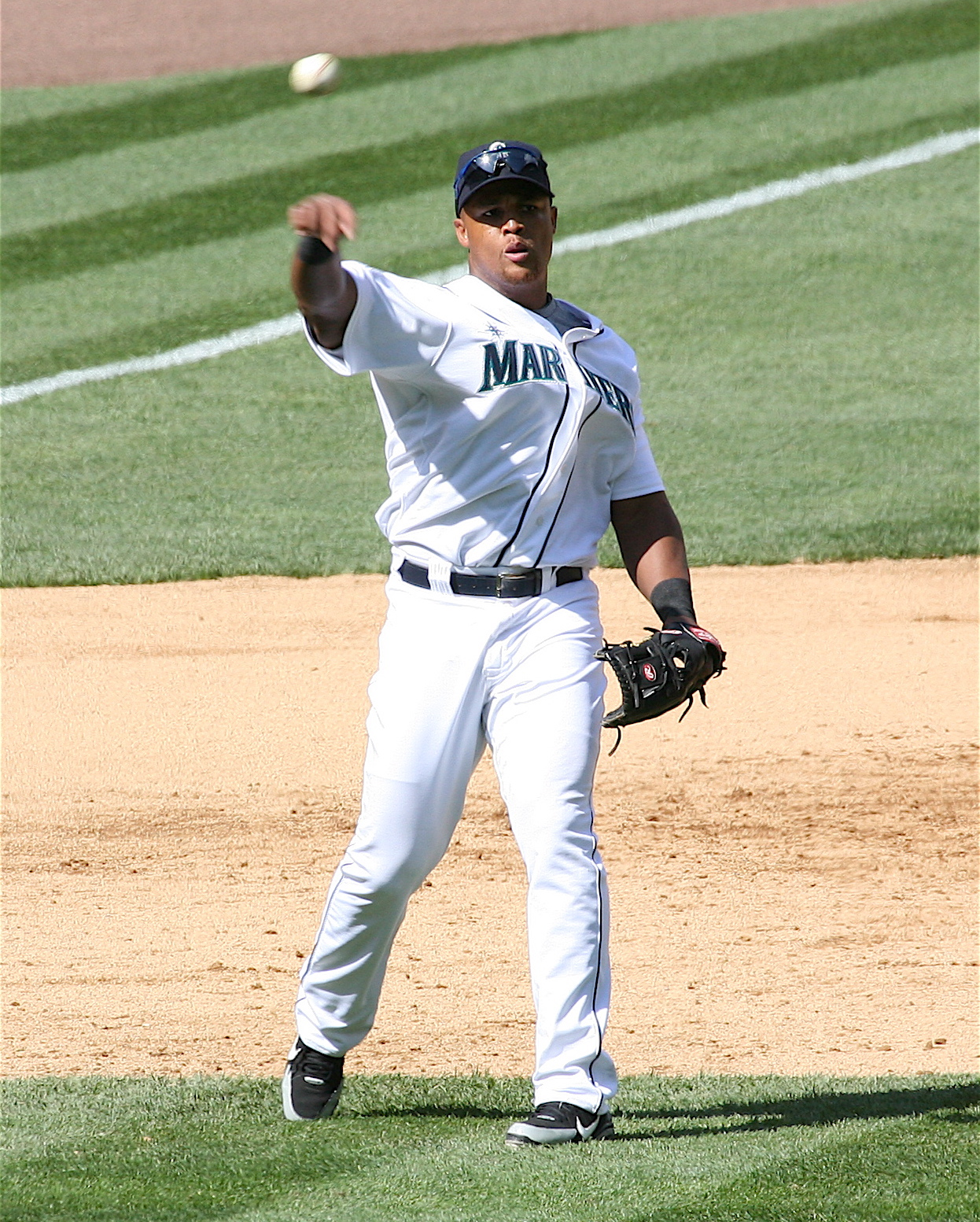
Beltré fielding in 2007

Despite many miscues, Beltré received recognition for his defense in 2007. He tied with Brandon Inge for the AL lead in errors by a third baseman, with 18, but ranked second in the league in assists, total chances, and range factor. He had the lowest fielding percentage of all third basemen in the league at .958. In spite of leading third basemen in errors, Beltré won his first Gold Glove Award, becoming the first Mariners third baseman to win the award. He won his second consecutive Fielding Bible Award, as well.

On September 1, Beltré hit for the cycle, becoming the fourth Mariner to do so. Arizona Diamondbacks shortstop Stephen Drew hit for the cycle that day as well, the first time two players had done so since 1920.

Beltré's decision not to wear a cup despite playing third base has been well-documented. This came back to hurt him on August 12, 2009, when he took a hard ground ball to the groin. Although he stayed in for the remainder of the 14-inning victory, he was put on the 15-day disabled list (DL) after suffering bleeding in one of his testicles. In his first game after returning from the DL, teammate Ken Griffey Jr. conspired with those responsible for the Safeco Field public address system to have Beltré's walk up music be the opening march from The Nutcracker Suite.

Beltré declared free agency on November 5, 2009.

=== Boston Red Sox (2010) ===
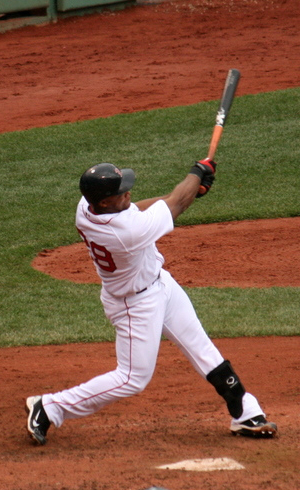
Beltré batting for the Boston Red Sox in 2010.

On January 7, 2010, Beltré signed a one-year, $9 million contract with the Boston Red Sox. The contract had a $5 million player option for 2011 with a $1 million buyout.

While Beltré's career before coming to the Red Sox had been regarded as somewhat disappointing, he hit .321 with 28 homers and 49 doubles in 2010, benefiting from the hitter-friendly Fenway Park. Beltré led the Red Sox in batting average and tied David Ortiz for the team lead in RBIs (102). Beltré led the majors in doubles with 49 (also a career-high). He also finished fourth in the AL in batting average, and was fifth in the league in total bases (326) and slugging percentage (.553). He finished ninth in MVP voting.

=== Texas Rangers (2011–2018) ===
On January 5, 2011, Beltré signed a five-year, $80 million contract with the Texas Rangers. He played with the Rangers for eight years until retiring in 2018. Beltré's statistics improved when he was in his 30s. While he had previously played in pitcher-friendly ballparks in Los Angeles and Seattle, the Rangers' ballpark was known as a hitter-friendly environment. The Wall Street Journal described Beltré's Rangers tenure as "nothing short of brilliant".

==== 2011 ====
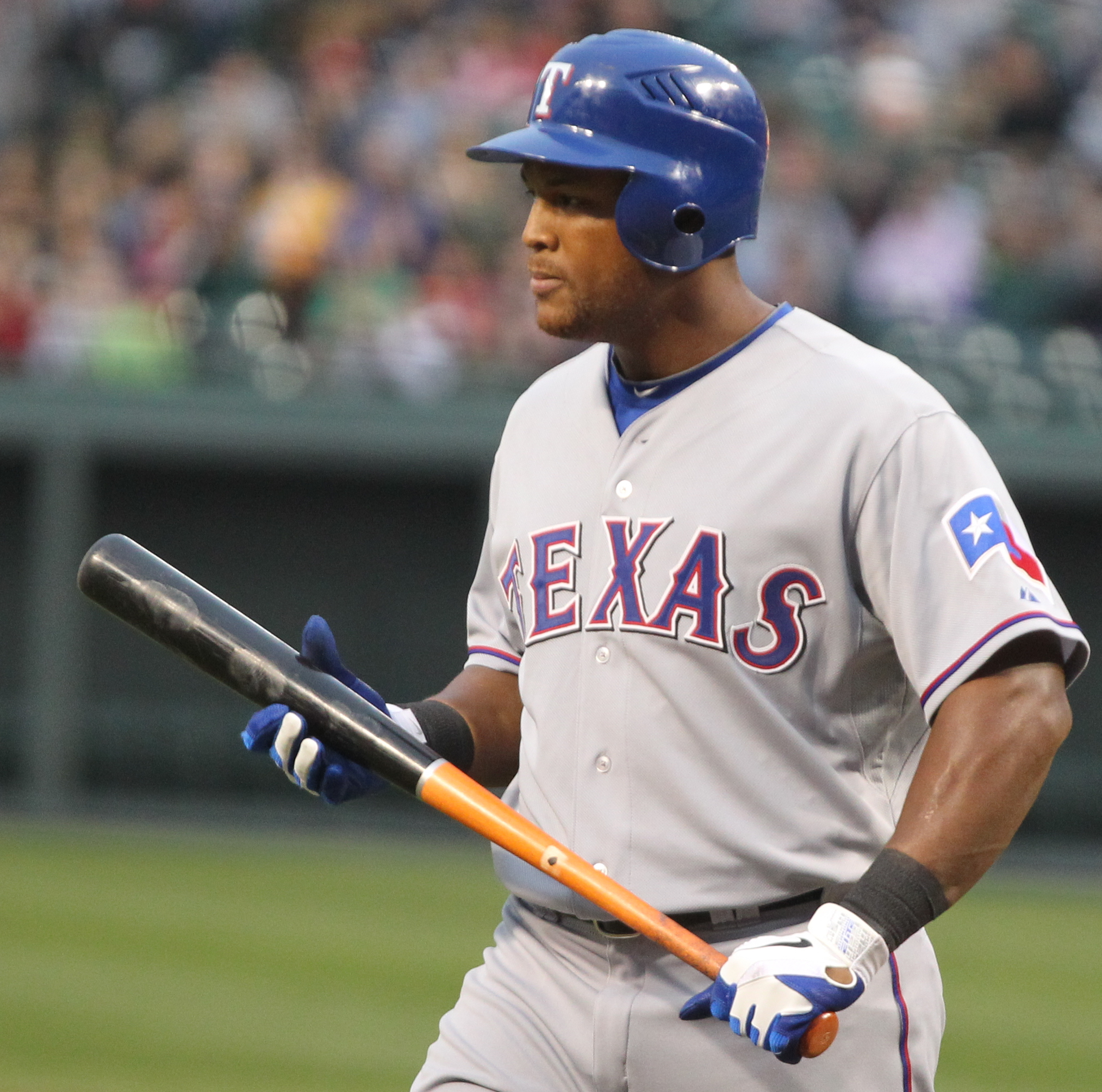
Adrián Beltré with the Texas Rangers in 2011

Beltré was on the 2011 American League All-Star team. On July 22, Beltré strained his hamstring and was also placed on the DL. On September 4, he singled to right for his 2,000th career hit. On September 11, Beltré hit two home runs, including the 300th of his career, against the Oakland Athletics. He was named the AL Player of the Month for September.

In 2011, Beltré batted .296 with 32 home runs, fifth in the AL. He was third in the American League in slugging percentage (.561), sixth in RBIs (105), and ninth in OPS (.892). The Fielding Bible said he saved 17 runs on defense in 2011.

On October 4, in Game 4 of the ALDS against the Tampa Bay Rays, Beltré became the sixth player to hit three home runs in a playoff game and the first do so in a Division Series.

Beltré played in the World Series with the Rangers. He added a fourth playoff home run in Game 5 of the World Series when he went down to one knee chasing an outside curve ball from Chris Carpenter. The St. Louis Cardinals defeated the Rangers in seven games.

More recognition was bestowed on Beltré for his defense. On November 1, he was honored with his third Gold Glove Award and first by a Ranger third baseman since Buddy Bell's six-year run from 1979 to 1984. He also won his third Fielding Bible Award. On November 2, he was awarded the Silver Slugger Award.

==== 2012 ====
Beltré was once again voted on to the All-Star Game starter, along with teammates Josh Hamilton and Mike Napoli. It was Beltré's third consecutive All-Star Game and the third of his career.

On August 22, against the Baltimore Orioles, Beltré hit three home runs in his first three at-bats, including two in the same inning. He joined Pablo Sandoval, Albert Pujols, George Brett, Reggie Jackson, and Babe Ruth as the only players to hit a three-homer game in both the regular season and the postseason. On August 24, he hit for the cycle for the second time in his career. Both of his cycles came at Rangers Ballpark. With his first coming as a member of the Mariners, it was the first time in MLB history that a player had hit for the cycle more than once at the same stadium. He joined Joe DiMaggio as the only players in big league history to have a three-homer game and a cycle in the same week. For his efforts, Beltré was named the AL Player of the Week for August 20–26. During the week, he hit .433 (13-for-30) with three doubles, one triple, five home runs, nine RBI, and seven runs scored. He had the highest slugging percentage (1.100) in the majors, the most total bases (33), was tied for first in hits and home runs, and tied for second in RBI.

After the season, Beltré won more defensive accolades. He won his second consecutive Fielding Bible Award and fourth overall. He was won a Gold Glove Award and his second Platinum Glove Award. Wilson Sporting Goods honored him as one of their Defensive Players of the Year in the first year of that award.

==== 2013 ====
The Rangers organization named Beltré the team captain in 2013.

Beltré was named the AL Player of the Week for July 1–7. He batted .478 (11-for-23) with four home runs, two doubles and five RBI in six games. He led the American League in home runs, slugging (1.087), OPS (1.607), total bases (25), and extra-base hits (six) while producing the fourth-highest batting average. Beltré hit safely in all six games with two or more hits four times. He had the 24th multi-homer game of his career with a pair of home runs on July 4 against Seattle.

Maintaining his strong hitting throughout July, Beltré was named the AL Player of the Month, his fourth career monthly award. He batted .369 with four doubles, nine homers, 19 RBI, and 13 runs scored over 26 games. He tied for the major league monthly lead in home runs with Alfonso Soriano and total bases with Torii Hunter (69). Beltré also was among the AL leaders in slugging percentage (second, .670), hits (tied for second, 38), extra-base hits (tied for fourth, 13), RBI (tied for fifth) and batting average (sixth). He capped off the month with a walk-off home run to lead the Rangers past the Angels on July 31, the seventh walk-off home run of his career and first with Texas. It was his third monthly award with Texas, making him one of seven players to win multiple times with the Rangers, including Josh Hamilton (four), Rafael Palmeiro, Alex Rodriguez (both with three), Iván Rodríguez, Juan González and Rubén Sierra (two each).

For the season, Beltré played in 161 games and totaled a .315 average, 30 homers, 92 RBI and .509 slugging percentage. He led the AL with 199 hits and was fourth in batting average and fifth in total bases (321). He also made the top-10 in games played, slugging percentage and home runs. In the AL MVP voting, he was tied for seventh place. The Dallas-Fort Worth chapter of the Baseball Writers' Association of America named Beltré the Texas Rangers Player of the Year.

==== 2014 ====
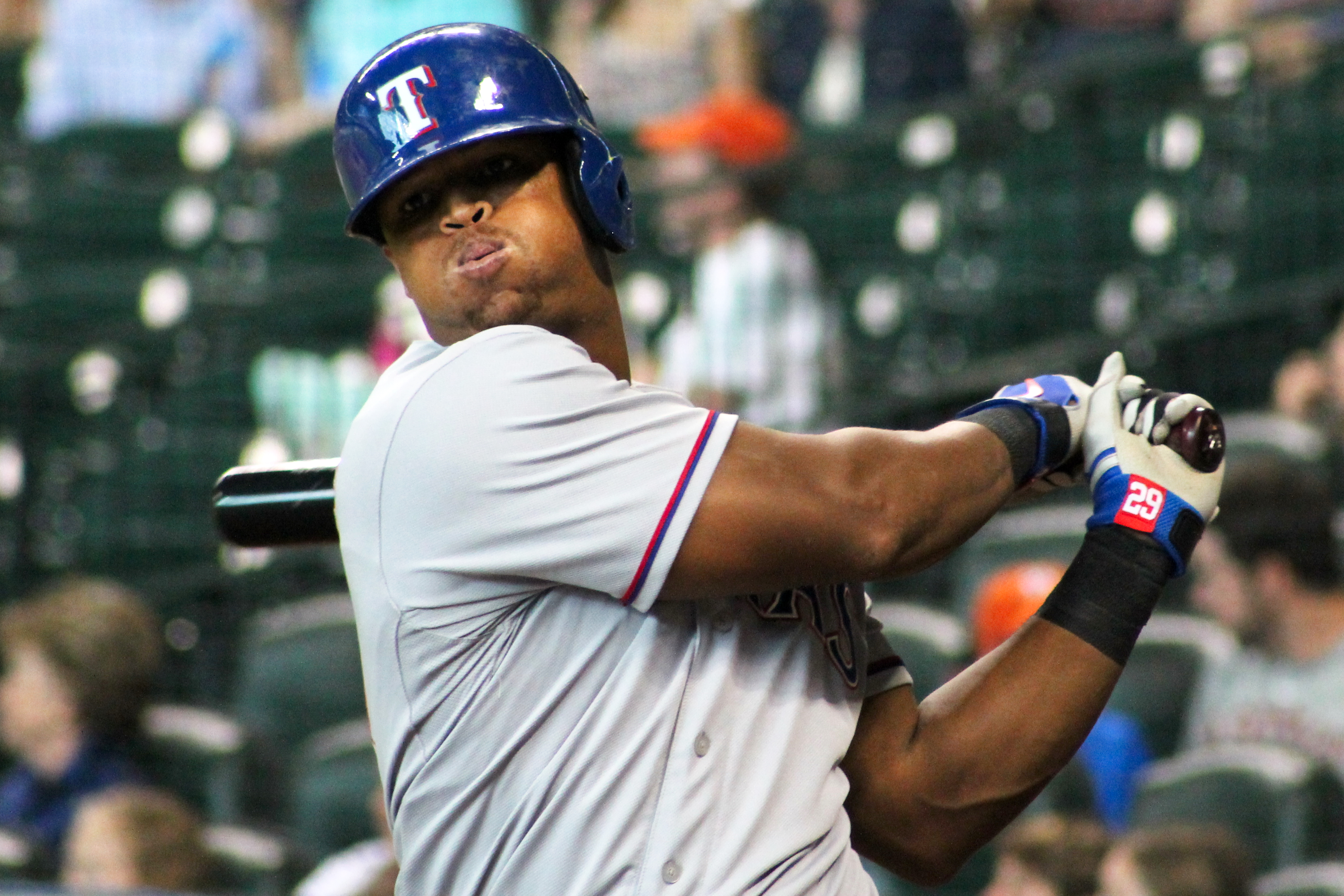
Beltré in August 2014

On May 7, 2014, while facing Jorge de la Rosa of the Colorado Rockies, Beltré hit his 100th home run as a member of the Rangers, becoming the fifth player in major league history to hit 100 home runs with three teams, following Darrell Evans, Reggie Jackson, Alex Rodriguez, and Jim Thome. On June 24, Beltré singled off Drew Smyly of the Detroit Tigers for his 2,500th career hit and the first hit of a 4-for-4 game. On September 18, Beltré singled off Sonny Gray in the first inning for his 2,591st hit, surpassing Vladimir Guerrero as the all-time hit leader among Dominican-born players.

Beltré finished the 2014 season batting .324, his highest average since 2004, with 19 home runs and 77 RBI in 148 games.

==== 2015 ====
In February, the Rangers picked up Beltré's option, which would have become guaranteed if he had reached 586 plate appearances in the 2015 season.

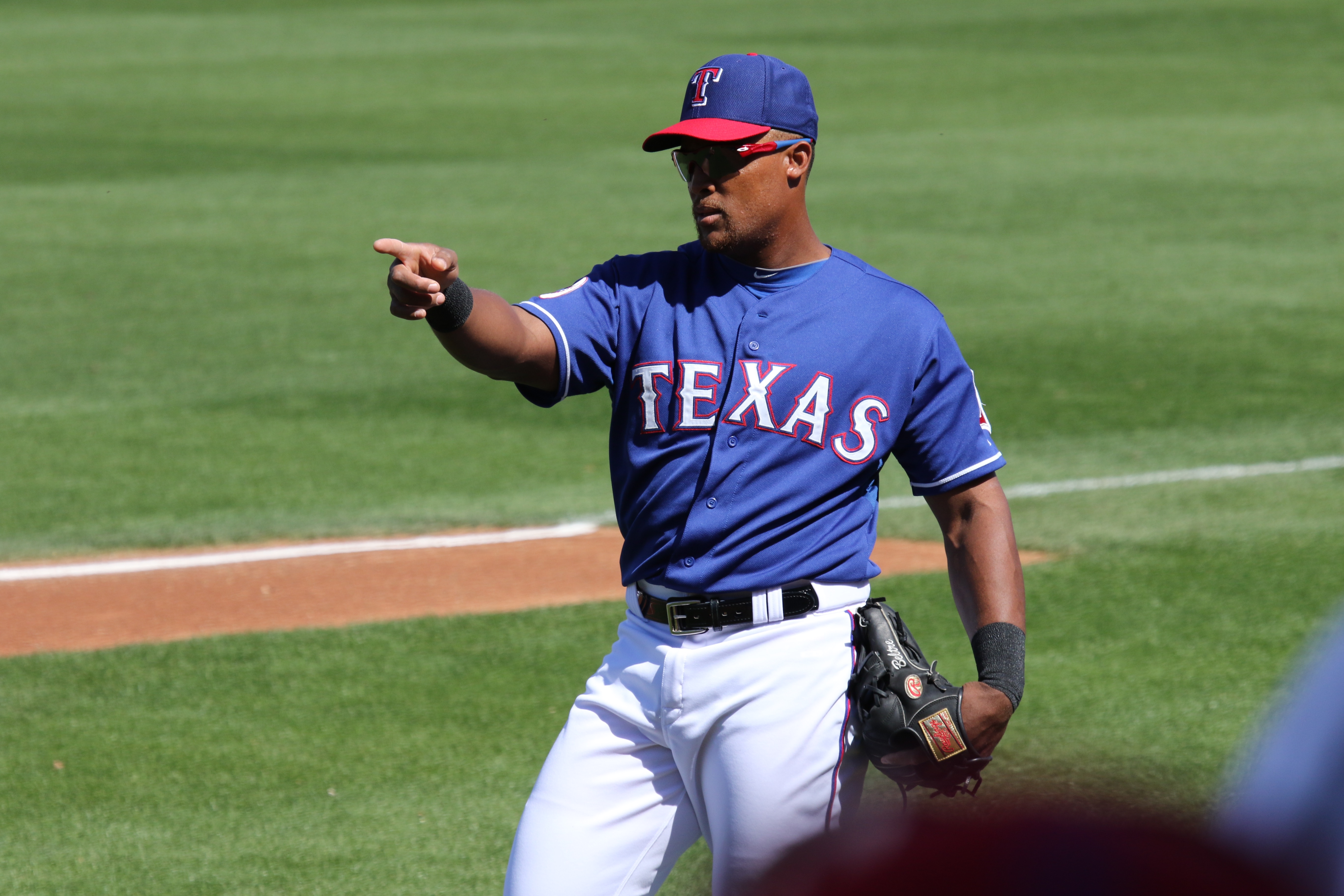
Beltré during spring training in 2015

While playing against Cleveland on May 15, Beltré hit his 400th home run on a sinker from Bruce Chen. He became the 52nd player in MLB history to reach that plateau, and the fourth to do so while playing at least 75 percent of his games at third base.

On August 3, Beltré hit for the cycle with hits in each of the first, second, third, and fifth innings at home against the Houston Astros in a 12–9 win. It was his third career cycle, second as a Ranger, and third at the Rangers' home park, making him the only player ever to hit three cycles in one stadium. He became the first Rangers player to hit for multiple cycles. The first player in 82 years to hit for a third cycle, he became the fourth player to do so and tied the major league record for total career cycles, joining Long John Reilly, Bob Meusel, and Babe Herman.

During the last week of the season, and the Rangers' run towards the AL West championship, Beltré batted .448 with two home runs and 13 RBI. He also went 2-for-4 with a home in the final game of the season to help the Rangers advance to their sixth AL West title. He finished the season with 18 home runs, 83 RBI, 163 hits, and .287 average.

Enduring a torn ligament in his left thumb over the last three months of the season, Beltré had surgery to repair it immediately after the season ended.

The Phi Delta Theta fraternity presented Beltré with the 2014 Lou Gehrig Memorial Award on September 17, 2015, making him the first Rangers player to win the award. He had contributed significantly to humanitarian acts in the Dallas–Fort Worth metroplex such as Texas Rangers Baseball Foundation, Texas Rangers RBI program, the I Love Baseball program, which operates in the Dominican Republic, the Baseball Tomorrow Fund, as well as the foundations established by a number of major league players.

==== 2016 ====
On April 15, Beltré and the Rangers agreed to a two-year, $36 million contract extension that would last through the 2018 seasons. The extension prevented Beltré from becoming a free agent at the end of the season.

Displaying a drop to one knee, Beltré hit a home run on a curve ball from Jesse Hahn of Oakland on May 17. In a May 29 game against the Pittsburgh Pirates, Beltré hit a two-run home run off Juan Nicasio to give him 1,501 career RBI, making him the 54th player to reach the milestone and the fourth third baseman. On July 2, Beltré became the 28th player all time to amass 10,000 career at-bats. On July 23, he became the 36th player all time to record 11,000 career plate appearances. Two days later, he hit a walk-off home run, the ninth of his career, against the Athletics in the bottom of the ninth inning for a 7−6 win.

On August 24, Beltré, in a game against the Cincinnati Reds, hit a go-ahead two-out double for his 2,900th career hit and led the Rangers to a 6–5 win. With this hit, Beltré became the 39th player in major league history to reach the milestone.

Beltré would once again show his signature home run knee drop after hitting a solo shot in the second inning in a game against the Houston Astros on September 13. His 30th of the season, it was the first time he reached the mark since 2013 and fifth in his career. Ten days later, his two-run home run in the eighth inning against the Athletics aided the Rangers in clinching the AL West division crown for the second year in a row and the seventh in franchise history. He also reached 100 RBI for the first time since 2012 and fifth time in his career. He won the Gold Glove at third base, the fifth of his career.

==== 2017 ====
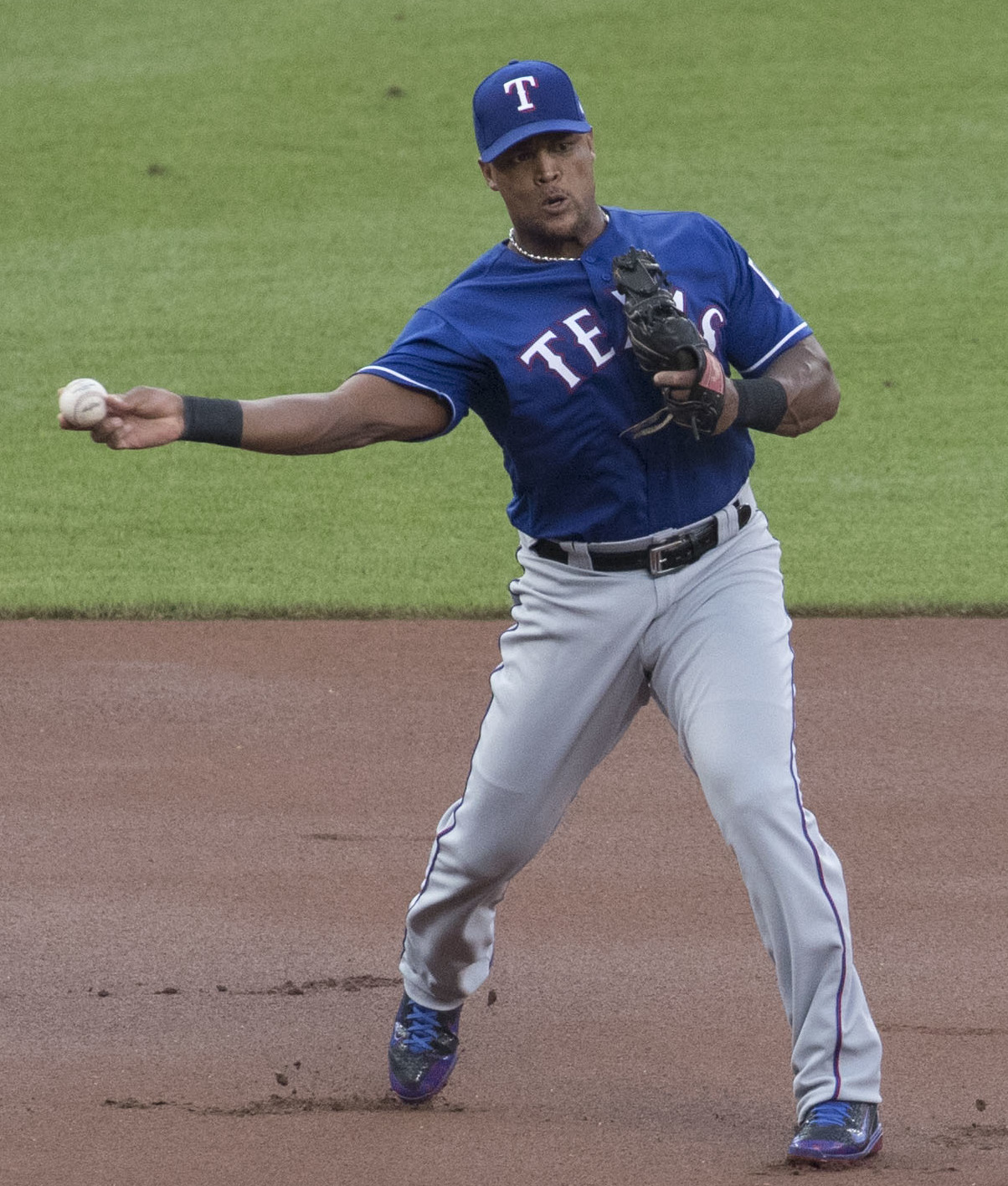
Beltré fielding in 2017

Beltré began the 2017 season on the 10-day disabled list after injuring his right leg near the end of spring training.

On July 4, Beltré hit his 600th career double, becoming the 17th player all-time to reach that milestone. On July 7, Beltré became the 21st player to amass 5,000 career total bases. On July 26, Beltré was ejected by umpire Gerry Davis; in a game against the Miami Marlins, Davis asked Beltré, who was the next scheduled batter, to move closer to the on-deck circle. Beltré responded by picking up the edge of the logo that marked the on-deck circle and moving it closer to where he had been standing, which prompted Davis to eject him.

Beltré collected his 3,000th hit with a double into left field against Wade Miley of the Baltimore Orioles on July 30, making him the 31st player to reach this milestone and the first Dominican-born player to accomplish it.

Beltré played in only 94 games in 2017 due to hamstring and calf problems.

==== 2018 ====
Prior to the start of the 2018 season, the Rangers signed Bartolo Colón, giving them the only two active players with at least 20 seasons in the major leagues and the last two active players to have played in 1990s. On April 5, Beltré doubled in the second inning versus the Oakland Athletics to pass Rod Carew as the all-time Latin American hits leader. On June 13, Beltré hit a double that gave him 3,090 career hits; this made him the all-time leader in hits by a player not born in the United States, surpassing former Mariners teammate Ichiro Suzuki.

On November 20, 2018, Beltré announced his retirement.

=== Career statistics ===
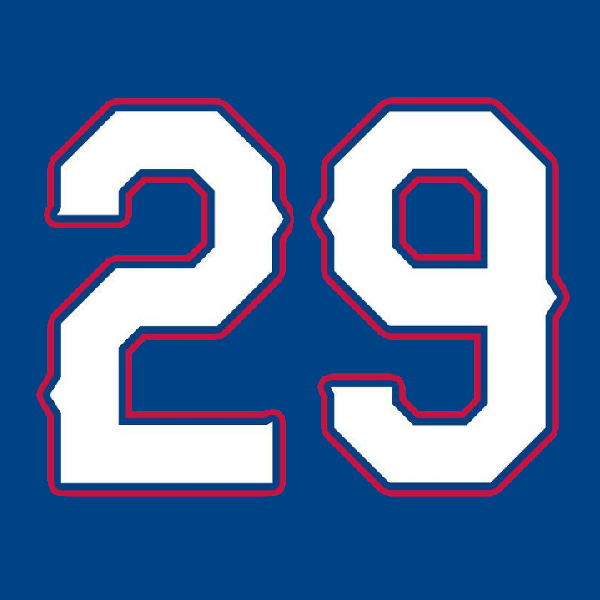
Adrián Beltré's number 29 was retired by the Texas Rangers in 2019.

In 2,933 games over 21 seasons, Beltré posted a .286 batting average with 3,166 hits, 477 home runs, 1,707 RBI, 121 stolen bases, 1,524 runs, 636 doubles, a .339 on-base percentage, a .480 slugging percentage, and a .960 fielding percentage. In 28 postseason games, he hit .261 with five home runs and 11 RBI.

=== Playing style and reputation ===
Beltré is regarded as one of the greatest third basemen of all time. Having played 21 major league seasons and won five Gold Gloves, he was notable for his longevity, fielding ability, and power hitting. The Rangers retired his number. In 2026, he was named one of the 50 greatest Mariners players.

Beltré's signature home run swing included a drop to one knee when connecting with a breaking ball, particularly notable during Game 5 of the 2011 World Series against Cardinals ace Chris Carpenter.

Beltré's defensive style was somewhat unorthodox. Rangers manager Ron Washington remarked that Beltré fielded ground balls incorrectly by stopping before catching the ball and relying very little on the positioning of his feet in throwing the ball to first base. Beltré explained that his arm was so strong that early in his career he was making many throwing errors; by planting his feet, he was able to improve his accuracy despite his lack of proper foot positioning. Another major league manager, Joe Maddon, compared the unique style of Beltré's defensive play to Ozzie Smith's "flair at shortstop", Stan Musial's "coiled batting stance", and the way Steve Carlton wrapped his left wrist before releasing a slider. Commented Maddon further on Beltré's defense, "There's a lot of guys that did things unique to them that weren't out of the Spalding Guide. They did things you wouldn't teach, and if somebody else tried to do it, they would not be very good." Rangers bench coach Steve Buechele said, "He's not your most conventional third baseman, he does things his own way and has developed his own style over his career but there's something to be said for his hand-eye coordination and his hands. It's remarkable what he does. ... He's a super smart player, knows where to position himself." Beltré was known for the sense of playfulness and joy that he exhibited on the field. He had a routine with Rangers shortstop Elvis Andrus on pop flies where both men put their arms up to catch the ball. During a game against the Red Sox on June 26, 2016, Sandy León hit a foul ball which landed in the first row in the stands, just out of Beltré's reach. However, instead of returning immediately to the infield, he reached very close to the ball in a motion, pretending as if he were going to take it away from the fan who caught León's foul ball. As a hitter, Beltré also regularly pointed to the first base umpire to appeal a checked swing, a move usually only done by catchers. Beltré also had a joking relationship with Mariners pitcher Felix Hernández, which included Beltré getting ejected in 2010, when the two former teammates first faced each other, and Hernández hugging Beltré on the field in 2017, the day after Beltré's 3,000th major league hit.

Beltré was also known for his dislike of anyone touching the top of his head. Before the game where he recorded his 3,000th hit, he let his teammates touch his head. Much to his dismay, the act turned into a game, inducing repeat offenders, including Andrus. Beltré also disliked Gatorade showers. After a game in which he hit a grand slam that provided the decisive runs in a 5–2 win over the Athletics on August 15, 2016, he took a broom from the groundskeepers closet and began combing an area of infield dirt. Still, Rougned Odor trotted to Beltré carrying a full drink bucket but missed drenching Beltré when he threw the blue sports drink at his teammate.

=== Awards and accomplishments ===
Awards

- All-World Baseball Classic Team (2006)
- 4× Fielding Bible Award at third base (2006, 2008, 2011, 2012)
- Lou Gehrig Memorial Award (2014)
- 4× MLB All-Star (2010–12, 2014)
- 4× MLB Player of the Month (September 2004, September 2011, September 2012, July 2013)
- 6× MLB Player of the Week (August 27, 2000; June 27, 2004; August 26, 2012; July 7, 2013; October 4, 2015; July 30, 2017)
- 2× Rawlings American League Platinum Glove Award (2011, 2012)
- 5× Rawlings Gold Glove Award at third base (2007, 2008, 2011, 2012, 2016)
- 4× Silver Slugger Award at third base (2004, 2010, 2011, 2014)
- 4× Texas Rangers Player of the Year (2012, 2013, 2014, 2016)
- Thomas A. Yawkey Award (Boston Red Sox team MVP) (2010)
- Wilson Defensive Player of the Year Award for the Texas Rangers (2012)

Selected MLB accomplishments

- First player from the Dominican Republic to reach 3,000 hits.
- Played 2,933 major league games; upon his retirement, this was the 14th most in major league history.
- Retired as the only third baseman in history with both 3,000 career hits and 400 homers.
- Retired as the all-time leader among third basemen in hits and RBIs and ranked third in home runs behind Mike Schmidt (548) and Eddie Mathews (512).
- One of five players to hit 100 home runs with three teams.
- Hit a record three cycles in the same stadium, Globe Life Park in Arlington.
- Tied MLB record as fourth player to hit for the cycle three times.
- Sixth player with a three-home-run game in both the postseason (October 4, 2011) and regular season (August 22, 2012).
- Second player with both a three-home-run game (August 22, 2012) and a cycle (August 24, 2012) during the same week.
- Had his number 29 retired by the Texas Rangers in 2019.

== International career ==
Beltré played for the Dominican Republic in the 2006 World Baseball Classic (WBC). He was named to the All-WBC team after hitting 4 home runs in six games. He also played in the 2017 WBC, batting 1-for-15 in four games. In 2017, he was dealing with leg injuries that caused him to miss the beginning of the MLB season.

Beltré was one of several Dominican Hall of Famers assisting general manager Nelson Cruz ahead of the 2026 WBC.

== Post-playing career ==
On June 5, 2023, Beltré was named the honorary general manager for the Karachi Monarchs of the Baseball United league for their inaugural season.

Beltré served as the manager for the American League team in the 2024 All-Star Futures Game.

== Personal life ==
Beltré and his wife have three children.

=== Philanthropy ===
Beltré has contributed to humanitarian activities in the Dallas–Fort Worth metroplex such as the Texas Rangers Baseball Foundation, Texas Rangers RBI program, the I Love Baseball program, which operates in the Dominican Republic, and the Baseball Tomorrow Fund. He has donated to Dave Valle's Esperanza International as well as foundations established by other MLB players, including Robinson Chirinos, Eddie Guardado, Joakim Soria, and Michael Young.

In 2021, Beltré helped pay to reconstruct a baseball stadium in the Dominican Republic where he grew up playing.

== See also ==
- List of Boston Red Sox award winners
- List of Major League Baseball annual doubles leaders
- List of Major League Baseball annual home run leaders
- List of Major League Baseball career assists leaders
- List of Major League Baseball career games played leaders
- List of Major League Baseball career hits leaders
- List of Major League Baseball career doubles leaders
- List of Major League Baseball career home run leaders
- List of Major League Baseball career putouts as a third baseman leaders
- List of Major League Baseball career runs batted in leaders
- List of Major League Baseball career runs scored leaders
- List of Major League Baseball career singles leaders
- List of Major League Baseball home run records
- List of Major League Baseball players from the Dominican Republic
- List of Major League Baseball players to hit for the cycle
- Los Angeles Dodgers award winners and league leaders
- Texas Rangers award winners and league leaders

Awards and achievements
Preceded by Barry Bonds	National League Player of the Month; September 2004	Succeeded by Derrek Lee
Preceded by Stephen Drew; Aaron Hill; Shin-Soo Choo	Hitting for the cycle September 1, 2008; August 24, 2012; August 3, 2015	Succeeded by Orlando Hudson; Mike Trout; Matt Kemp
