= Joey Amalfitano =

American baseball player (born 1934)

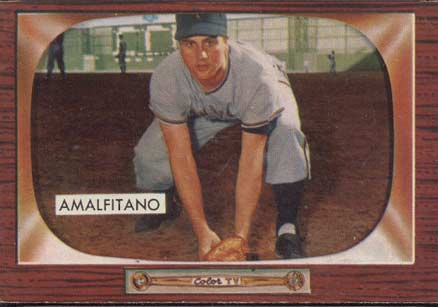
- Second baseman / Third baseman / Manager / Coach
- Born: January 23, 1934 (age 92); San Pedro, California, U.S.
- Batted: Right Threw: Right

MLB debut
- May 3, 1954, for the New York Giants

Last MLB appearance
- June 27, 1967, for the Chicago Cubs

MLB statistics
- Batting average: .244
- Hits: 418
- Home runs: 9
- Runs: 248
- Managerial record: 66–116
- Winning %: .363
- Stats at Baseball Reference
- Managerial record at Baseball Reference

Teams
- As player: New York / San Francisco Giants (1954–1955; 1960–1961; 1963); Houston Colt .45's (1962); Chicago Cubs (1964–1967); As manager: Chicago Cubs (1979; 1980–1981); As coach: Chicago Cubs (1967–1971; 1978–1979); San Francisco Giants (1972–1975); San Diego Padres (1976–1977); Cincinnati Reds (1982); Los Angeles Dodgers (1983–1998)

Career highlights and awards
- World Series champion (1988)

John Joseph Amalfitano (born January 23, 1934) is an American former utility infielder, manager and coach in Major League Baseball (MLB). He played a combined ten seasons with the New York and San Francisco Giants (1954–55; 1960–61; 1963), Houston Colt .45s (1962) and Chicago Cubs (1964–67), and managed the Cubs from 1979–81.

Amalfitano was the Los Angeles Dodgers' third-base coach for sixteen years (1983–98), which included the 1988 World Series championship. After serving as a special assistant for player development for the Giants, primarily working in the club's farm system, the team announced in January 2021 that Amalfitano would retire just shy of his 87th birthday on January 23 after 30 years and five different terms.

== Playing career ==
1962 picture pack card of Amalfitano for Houston Colt .45s

A native of San Pedro, California, Amalfitano attended Saint Anthony High School in Long Beach, Loyola University of Los Angeles, and the University of Southern California. Because he signed a "bonus contract" when he became a professional player in 1954, Amalfitano spent the first two years of his pro career sitting on the bench of the New York Giants under the terms of the rule then in force. But after four years in the minor leagues, he returned to the National League in 1960 and played through the middle of 1967 for the Giants, Houston Colt .45s and Chicago Cubs. Amalfitano, a right-handed hitter and thrower, stood 5 feet 11 inches (1.80 m) tall and weighed 175 pounds (79 kg). In 642 MLB games played, he batted .244 in 1,715 at bats with 418 hits and nine home runs.

== Managerial/coaching career ==
After playing his final game on June 27, 1967, Amalfitano became a coach for the Cubs, serving under his first-ever manager, Leo Durocher. He moved back to the Giants as a coach in 1972, then to the San Diego Padres from 1976–77, before rejoining the Cubs as a member of Herman Franks' staff in 1978–79.

Amalfitano served as Chicago's interim manager after Franks' resignation in September 1979, compiling a record of 2–5 to finish the season. That autumn, the Cubs appointed Preston Gómez manager, with Amalfitano retained as a coach. But when Chicago started the 1980 campaign poorly under Gómez, winning only 38 of its first 90 games, he was fired July 25 and Amalfitano was named his permanent successor. The Cubs won only 26 games, losing 46, to remain in the basement of the National League East Division, but Amalfitano was allowed to return for 1981. During that strike-shortened, split-season campaign, his team won a total of 38 games, losing 65, finishing last and next-to-last with the worst overall record in the division. At season's end, he was fired during a general housecleaning of the Chicago front office. Amalfitano's career record as a manager, over all or parts of three seasons with the Cubs, was 66–116 (.363).

He remained active in baseball, returning to coaching with the Cincinnati Reds (1982) and then spending 16 seasons as the third base coach for the Los Angeles Dodgers (1983–98). He then was a consultant with the Dodgers' baseball operations department and worked with minor league infielders in his original organization, the Giants, before assuming his current position with them. His primary role has been to instruct the Giants' minor leaguers on baseball fundamentals, especially bunting.

Preceded by Tommy Lasorda	Los Angeles Dodgers Third Base Coach; 1983–1998	Succeeded by Glenn Hoffman
