= D. T. Cromer =

American baseball player (born 1971)

- First baseman
- Born: March 19, 1971 (age 54); Lake City, South Carolina, U.S.
- Batted: Left Threw: Left

Professional debut
- MLB: April 5, 2000, for the Cincinnati Reds
- NPB: April 5, 2002, for the Nippon-Ham Fighters

Last appearance
- MLB: October 7, 2001, for the Cincinnati Reds
- NPB: August 27, 2003, for the Nippon-Ham Fighters

MLB statistics
- Batting average: .308
- Home runs: 7
- Runs batted in: 20
- Stats at Baseball Reference

Teams
- Cincinnati Reds (2000–2001); Nippon-Ham Fighters (2002–2003)

D. T. Cromer (born March 19, 1971) is an American former professional baseball player. He graduated from Lexington High School in Lexington, South Carolina and played baseball in college at the University of South Carolina. He went on to play baseball in MLB (drafted by the Oakland Athletics in the 11th round of the 1992 Major League Baseball draft), as well as in Japan. He played in a total of 85 big league games, all with the Cincinnati Reds. He declined assignment to Triple-A in 2001 and played for the Nippon-Ham Fighters of the Nippon Professional Baseball (NPB). His older brother, Tripp was also a Major League Baseball player.
