= Jim Bruske =

American baseball player (born 1964)

- Pitcher
- Born: October 7, 1964 (age 61); East St. Louis, Illinois, U.S.
- Batted: Right Threw: Right

MLB debut
- August 25, 1995, for the Los Angeles Dodgers

Last MLB appearance
- May 13, 2000, for the Milwaukee Brewers

MLB statistics
- Win–loss record: 9–1
- Earned run average: 4.13
- Strikeouts: 95
- Stats at Baseball Reference

Teams
- Los Angeles Dodgers (1995–1996); San Diego Padres (1997–1998); Los Angeles Dodgers (1998); New York Yankees (1998); Milwaukee Brewers (2000)

James Scott Bruske (born October 7, 1964) is an American former Major League Baseball right-handed pitcher for the Los Angeles Dodgers, San Diego Padres, New York Yankees and Milwaukee Brewers from 1995 to 2000. He is currently a real estate agent in Scottsdale, Arizona.
