= Frank Lankford =

American baseball player (born 1971)

- Pitcher
- Born: March 26, 1971 (age 54); Atlanta, Georgia, U.S.
- Batted: Right Threw: Right

MLB debut
- March 31, 1998, for the Los Angeles Dodgers

Last MLB appearance
- May 13, 1998, for the Los Angeles Dodgers

MLB statistics
- Win–loss record: 0–2
- Earned run average: 5.95
- Strikeouts: 7
- Stats at Baseball Reference

Teams
- Los Angeles Dodgers (1998)

Frank Greenfield Lankford (born March 26, 1971) is a former Major League Baseball right-handed pitcher. He is an alumnus of the University of Virginia.

Drafted by the New York Yankees in the 17th round of the 1993 MLB amateur draft, Lankford would make his Major League Baseball debut with the Los Angeles Dodgers on March 31, 1998, and appear in his final game on May 13, 1998.
