= Sean Maloney (baseball) =

American baseball player (born 1971)

- Pitcher
- Born: May 25, 1971 (age 54); South Kingstown, Rhode Island, U.S.
- Batted: Right Threw: Right

MLB debut
- April 28, 1997, for the Milwaukee Brewers

Last MLB appearance
- September 26, 1998, for the Los Angeles Dodgers

MLB statistics
- Win–loss record: 0-1
- Earned run average: 5.03
- Strikeouts: 16
- Stats at Baseball Reference

Teams
- Milwaukee Brewers (1997); Los Angeles Dodgers (1998)

Sean Patrick Maloney (born May 25, 1971) is a former Major League Baseball right-handed pitcher for the Los Angeles Dodgers and Milwaukee Brewers from 1997-1998.
