= Trenidad Hubbard =

American baseball player (born 1964)

- Outfielder
- Born: May 11, 1964 (age 62); Chicago, Illinois, U.S.
- Batted: Right Threw: Right

MLB debut
- July 7, 1994, for the Colorado Rockies

Last MLB appearance
- June 27, 2003, for the Chicago Cubs

MLB statistics
- Batting average: .257
- Home runs: 16
- Runs batted in: 72
- Stats at Baseball Reference

Teams
- Colorado Rockies (1994–1996); San Francisco Giants (1996); Cleveland Indians (1997); Los Angeles Dodgers (1998–1999); Atlanta Braves (2000); Baltimore Orioles (2000); Kansas City Royals (2001); San Diego Padres (2002); Chicago Cubs (2003)

Trenidad Aviel Hubbard (born Trent Hubbard, May 11, 1964) is an American former Major League Baseball journeyman outfielder. He is an alumnus of Southern University and A&M College.

Drafted by the Houston Astros in the 12th round of the 1986 MLB amateur draft, Hubbard made his major league debut with the Colorado Rockies on July 7, 1994, at age 30. He had two plate appearances for the Rockies in the 1995 National League division playoffs.

After signing with the Los Angeles Dodgers as a free agent on December 3, 1997, Hubbard had his best season in the majors. Appearing in 94 games, he hit .298 with nine stolen bases and seven home runs.

Hubbard finished his MLB career with 196 hits and a batting average of .257. In parts of 19 seasons in the minor leagues, he recorded 1,864 hits and a batting average of .302.

Hubbard was primarily an outfielder, but occasionally logged in some games in the infield. In one game against the Seattle Mariners in 1999, he played the last three innings at catcher after a brawl injured Angel Peña and led to the ejection of Todd Hundley.

Hubbard last played professional baseball in 2005, when he split the season among three class AAA teams, the Durham Bulls, Round Rock Express, and Iowa Cubs. He is a graduate of South Shore High School in Chicago.
