= Jim Eisenreich =

American baseball player (born 1959)

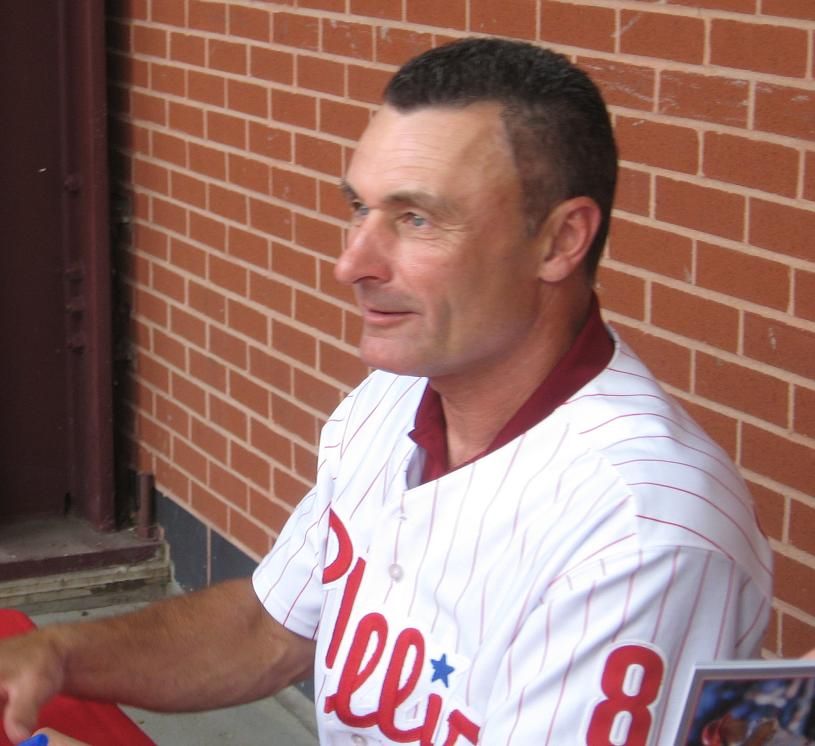
- Eisenreich at the Philadelphia Phillies Alumni Night in 2009
- Outfielder
- Born: April 18, 1959 (age 67); St. Cloud, Minnesota, U.S.
- Batted: Left Threw: Left

MLB debut
- April 6, 1982, for the Minnesota Twins

Last MLB appearance
- September 26, 1998, for the Los Angeles Dodgers

MLB statistics
- Batting average: .290
- Home runs: 52
- Runs batted in: 477
- Stats at Baseball Reference

Teams
- Minnesota Twins (1982–1984); Kansas City Royals (1987–1992); Philadelphia Phillies (1993–1996); Florida Marlins (1997–1998); Los Angeles Dodgers (1998)

Career highlights and awards
- World Series champion (1997)

James Michael Eisenreich (/ˈaɪzɪnraɪk/ EYE-zin-ryke; born April 18, 1959) is an American former Major League Baseball player with a 15-year career from 1982 to 1984 and 1987 to 1998. He played for the Minnesota Twins and Kansas City Royals of the American League, and the Philadelphia Phillies, Florida Marlins and Los Angeles Dodgers of the National League. He played first base, outfield and designated hitter.

== Major league career ==
In 1993, his first year with the Phillies, Eisenreich put together one of his best seasons, batting .318 and helping the Phillies win the National League pennant. As the Phillies began their slide the next season, Eisenreich was one of the team's few bright spots, batting .361 for the last-place Phillies in 1996.

After signing with the Florida Marlins for the 1997 season, Eisenreich played a pivotal role in the 1997 World Series, helping the Marlins win a championship in their fifth year. Eisenreich was the runner on second base when Edgar Renteria hit his walk-off single in the bottom of the 11th inning of Game 7.

Eisenreich was part of a "blockbuster" baseball trade on May 14, 1998. He was traded from the Marlins, with Bobby Bonilla, Gary Sheffield, Charles Johnson, and Manuel Barrios, to the Los Angeles Dodgers for Todd Zeile and Mike Piazza.

Eisenreich was noted in Los Angeles for his longtime success against Dodger pitching staffs, despite those staffs being among the best. His .405 batting average and .620 slugging percentage greatly exceed his other career numbers and rank among the most successful of any one player against any team.

In 1,422 games over 15 seasons, Eisenreich posted a .290 batting average (1,160-for-3,995) with 492 runs, 221 doubles, 39 triples, 52 home runs, 477 RBI, 105 stolen bases, 324 bases on balls, .341 on-base percentage and .404 slugging percentage. He finished his career with a .988 fielding percentage playing at all three outfield positions and first base. In 20 postseason games, he hit .231 (12-for-52) with 4 runs, 2 home runs, 11 RBI and 7 walks.

== Personal life ==
Eisenreich has Tourette syndrome, which caused him to go on to the voluntary retirement list between 1984 and 1987 while undergoing treatment. He was replaced on the Twins roster by Kirby Puckett. In 1990, he was the first recipient of the Tony Conigliaro Award, which is given annually to a Major League Baseball player who has overcome a significant obstacle.

Eisenreich was inducted into the Baseball Reliquary's Shrine of the Eternals in 2009.

Eisenreich resides in the Kansas City area and runs the Jim Eisenreich Foundation for Children with Tourette's Syndrome, whose goal is to help children with TS achieve personal success.
