= Charles Johnson (catcher) =

American baseball player (born 1971)

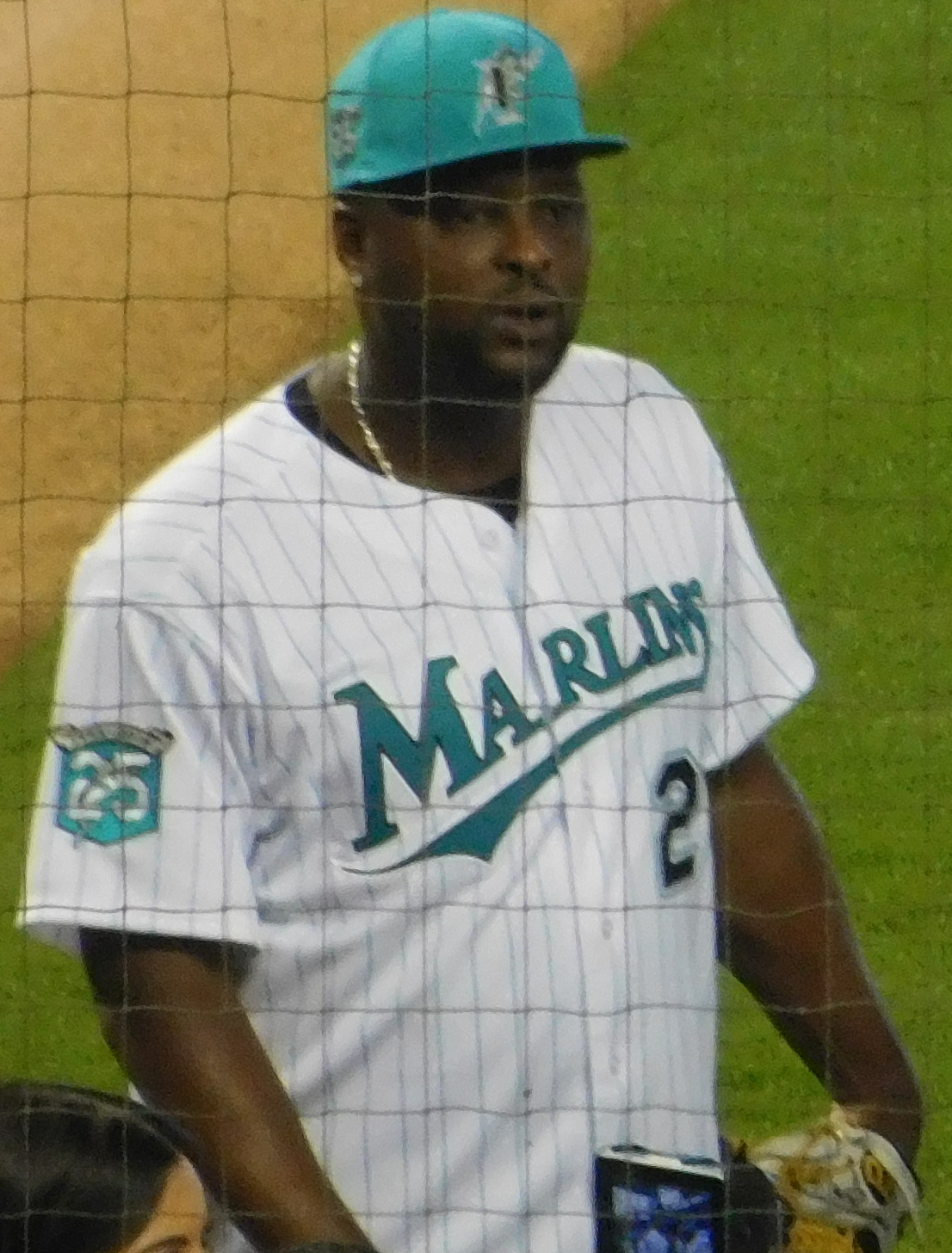
- Johnson in 2018
- Catcher
- Born: July 20, 1971 (age 55); Fort Pierce, Florida, U.S.
- Batted: Right Threw: Right

MLB debut
- May 6, 1994, for the Florida Marlins

Last MLB appearance
- June 11, 2005, for the Tampa Bay Devil Rays

MLB statistics
- Batting average: .245
- Home runs: 167
- Runs batted in: 570
- Stats at Baseball Reference

Teams
- Florida Marlins (1994–1998); Los Angeles Dodgers (1998); Baltimore Orioles (1999–2000); Chicago White Sox (2000); Florida Marlins (2001–2002); Colorado Rockies (2003–2004); Tampa Bay Devil Rays (2005)

Career highlights and awards
- 2× All-Star (1997, 2001); World Series champion (1997); 4× Gold Glove Award (1995–1998)
Medals
Men's baseball
Representing United States
Pan American Games
| Bronze medal – third place | 1991 Havana | Team |
World Junior Baseball Championship
| Gold medal – first place | 1988 Sydney | Team |

Charles Edward Johnson Jr. (born July 20, 1971) is an American former professional baseball player. He played as a catcher in Major League Baseball with the Florida Marlins (1994–1998, 2001–2002), the Los Angeles Dodgers (1998), the Baltimore Orioles (1999–2000), the Chicago White Sox (2000), the Colorado Rockies (2003–2004), and the Tampa Bay Devil Rays (2005).

The two-time National League All-Star player was considered one of the best defensive catchers of his era, winning four consecutive Gold Glove Awards between 1995 and 1998. He was a member of the 1997 world champion Florida Marlins team and is one of only three catchers in Major League history to catch at least 100 games in a single season without committing an error.

== Early life and major League career ==
Johnson was born in Fort Pierce, Florida, where he graduated from Fort Pierce Westwood High School in Fort Pierce, Florida. He was drafted by the Montreal Expos in the first round of the 1989 Major League Baseball draft. He did not sign, and decided to enroll at the University of Miami, where he played for the Miami Hurricanes baseball team. He was drafted by the Florida Marlins in the first round of the 1992 Major League Baseball draft. He played with the A-level Kane County Cougars in 1993 and the AA Portland Sea Dogs.

In 1995, Johnson's reputation as a skilled defensive player was solidified when he became the fourth catcher in Major League history to win a Gold Glove Award in his rookie season, joining Johnny Bench, Carlton Fisk and Sandy Alomar Jr. Although his offensive statistics weren't impressive, he made up for those shortcomings by helping his team with his superior defensive skills. In 1996, Johnson caught Al Leiter's no-hitter against the Colorado Rockies. Johnson set a Major League record in 1997 by playing in 123 games without committing a single error, earning him his first All-Star selection, and helping the Marlins win the 1997 World Series against the Cleveland Indians. Johnson led the Marlins in the Series with 10 hits, batting .357 including one home run. Along with winning his third consecutive Gold Glove Award in 1997, he also caught his second no-hitter when Kevin Brown no-hit the Giants on June 10.

In 1998, the Marlins traded Johnson along with Bobby Bonilla, Jim Eisenreich, Gary Sheffield and Manuel Barriosto to the Los Angeles Dodgers in exchange for Mike Piazza and Todd Zeile. After finishing the season with the Dodgers, he played for two years in the American League with the Baltimore Orioles and the Chicago White Sox. He had his best year offensively in 2000, when he had a .304 batting average along with 31 home runs and 91 RBIs, during a season in which he played 84 games for the Orioles and 44 games for the White Sox.

In 2001 he was traded back to the Marlins, where he hit .285 with 16 home runs by mid-season to earn his second All-Star berth. He would also catch his third no hitter when A. J. Burnett no hit the San Diego Padres on May 12. The only Marlins no-hitters Johnson has not caught for Florida were in 2006, when Aníbal Sánchez threw a no-hitter in Dolphin Stadium against the Arizona Diamondbacks, 2013 when Henderson Álvarez no-hit the Detroit Tigers, and 2017 when Edinson Vólquez no-hit the Diamondbacks.

After the 2002 season, the Marlins traded Johnson to the Colorado Rockies where he played for two seasons. On April 27, 2004, he, rookie Matt Holliday, and Jeromy Burnitz combined to slug back-to-back-to-back home runs against the Marlins, the sixth such occasion in franchise history. After playing for Colorado, he ended his career with the Tampa Bay Devil Rays, playing his final game on June 11, 2005 at the age of 33.

== Career statistics ==
In a twelve-season major league career covering 1,188 games, Johnson had a .245 batting average along with 167 home runs, 570 runs batted in and a .993 fielding percentage. His .993 fielding percentage ranks 16th all-time among major league catchers. Along with his four Gold Glove Awards, Johnson twice led National League catchers in fielding percentage, and once each in baserunners caught stealing and assists. During his playing career, he ranked second only to Iván Rodríguez in throwing out baserunners, with a 39% average. He earned two All-Star berths as well as winning a World Series during his career. His three no hitters caught ties him with several other players for third place on the all-time list behind the four no hitters caught by Jason Varitek and Carlos Ruiz. Johnson played more games as a catcher than any other player in Marlins history with 582.

Johnson is a member of the Portland Sea Dogs Hall of Fame.

== Personal life ==
Johnson now lives in Miami with his wife Rhonda. They have two sons. Brandon, who is a wide receiver in the National Football League (NFL) and former college football wide receiver for the University of Tennessee, and Beau, who plays college football as a tight end for Georgia Southern University. Johnson is a cousin of former Major Leaguers Fred McGriff and Terry McGriff. He is also related to former NFL wide receiver Chad Johnson.
