= Bob Graziano =

American baseball executive

Bob Graziano is a former president and chief operating officer of the Los Angeles Dodgers of Major League Baseball. He currently serves as a vice chairman of J.P. Morgan Chase in the Private Bank. Prior to assuming this role, Graziano served as J.P. Morgan Chase's Southern California market manager in the Private Bank beginning in May 2013. Prior to his involvement with J.P. Morgan, he was managing partner, family advisory services of Northern Trust, a wealth management company.

Graziano graduated summa cum laude from the University of Southern California in 1980 with a business administration degree with an emphasis in accounting. His first job was as a certified public accountant at Ernst & Young. He worked there for four years until he took a leave of absence to work for the 1984 Los Angeles Olympics Organizing Committee in ticket operations.

Graziano joined the Dodgers organization in 1986 as director of financial projects and became chief financial officer of the team in 1987. He was promoted to executive vice-president in 1997 and was named president of the team in 1998 when News Corporation bought the Dodgers from Peter O'Malley. He worked with CEO Robert A. Daly in managing the day-to-day operations of the Dodgers.

Graziano left the organization in 2004 when the team was sold to Frank McCourt. He briefly worked with O'Malley Seidler Partners LLP before joining Northern Trust as a managing director. He worked at Northern Trust until joining J.P. Morgan Private Bank in May 2013.

Graziano has served on numerous nonprofit boards, including LA84 Foundation, Los Angeles Sports and Entertainment Commission, Los Angeles Premier Water Polo Club, LA's BEST, USC Leventhal School of Accounting, USC Sports Business Institute, USC Associates, Jackie Robinson Foundation, Jim Murray Memorial Foundation, Japan America Society of Southern California, and the Dodger Foundation.

Graziano is married to Wendy Wachtell, president of the Joseph Drown Foundation. They have five sons: Matthew Graziano, Jameson Wachtell, Brian Graziano, Bradley Wachtell, and Davis Wachtell.

Preceded by Peter O'Malley	President of the Los Angeles Dodgers; 1998–2004	Succeeded by Jamie McCourt
