= Tripp Cromer =

American baseball player (born 1967)

- Infielder
- Born: November 21, 1967 (age 58); Lake City, South Carolina, U.S.
- Batted: Right Threw: Right

MLB debut
- September 7, 1993, for the St. Louis Cardinals

Last MLB appearance
- May 27, 2003, for the Houston Astros

MLB statistics
- Batting average: .225
- Home runs: 12
- Runs batted in: 48
- Stats at Baseball Reference

Teams
- St. Louis Cardinals (1993–1995); Los Angeles Dodgers (1997–1999); Houston Astros (2000, 2003)

Roy Bunyan "Tripp" Cromer III (born November 21, 1967) is an American former professional baseball player. He is an alumnus of the University of South Carolina. His younger brother, D. T. was also a Major League Baseball player.

Drafted by the St. Louis Cardinals in the third round of the 1988 MLB amateur draft, Cromer made his Major League Baseball debut with the St. Louis Cardinals on September 7, 1993. He appeared in his last major league game in 2003.

Cromer spent most of his career as a reserve infielder who played for an injured Ozzie Smith after coming up with the St. Louis Cardinals. Along with the Cardinals, Cromer played for the Los Angeles Dodgers and Houston Astros organizations.
