= Bobby Bonilla =

American baseball player (born 1963)

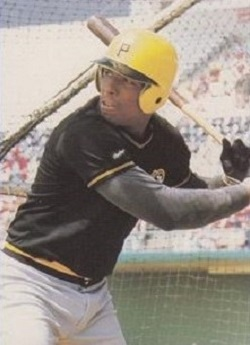
- Bonilla playing for the Pirates circa 1988
- Third baseman / Right fielder
- Born: February 23, 1963 (age 63); The Bronx, New York, U.S.
- Batted: Switch Threw: Right

MLB debut
- April 9, 1986, for the Chicago White Sox

Last MLB appearance
- October 7, 2001, for the St. Louis Cardinals

MLB statistics
- Batting average: .279
- Hits: 2,010
- Home runs: 287
- Runs batted in: 1,173
- Stats at Baseball Reference

Teams
- Chicago White Sox (1986); Pittsburgh Pirates (1986–1991); New York Mets (1992–1995); Baltimore Orioles (1995–1996); Florida Marlins (1997–1998); Los Angeles Dodgers (1998); New York Mets (1999); Atlanta Braves (2000); St. Louis Cardinals (2001)

Career highlights and awards
- 6× All-Star (1988–1991, 1993, 1995); World Series champion (1997); 3× Silver Slugger Award (1988, 1990, 1991)

Roberto Martin Antonio Bonilla (/boʊˈniːjə/ boh-NEE-yə; born February 23, 1963) is an American former professional baseball third baseman and outfielder who played in Major League Baseball (MLB) from 1986 to 2001.

Bonilla was one of MLB's best batters and overall top players in the late 1980s and early 1990s with powerful hitting strength, as well as a part of the highly successful and pennant contending Pittsburgh Pirates organization around the same time. Bonilla recorded impressive statistics in home runs, RBIs, doubles, extra base hits, and Wins Above Replacement averages, as well as four All-Star selections, three Silver Slugger Awards and was a top candidate for the National League's Most Valuable Player award during his tenure with the Pirates. He led the league in extra base hits (78) during the 1990 MLB season and doubles (44) during the 1991 MLB season.

Bonilla signed with the New York Mets during the 1991–92 offseason, becoming the highest-paid player in the league at the time, earning more than $6 million per year. However, he struggled to live up to expectations with the Mets (which made the contract the subject of much criticism) and throughout the rest of his career. He played with the Baltimore Orioles from 1995 to 1996, reaching the American League Championship Series with the team in 1996. He earned two additional All-Star appearances and helped the Florida Marlins win the 1997 World Series.

After being traded to the Los Angeles Dodgers partway through the 1998 season, he was traded back to the New York Mets before the 1999 season. When the Mets wanted to release him at the end of the year, he negotiated a settlement whereby the Mets would pay him $1.19 million on July 1 every year from 2011 through 2035, a date that has become known in Mets fandom as "Bobby Bonilla Day". He is also paid $500,000 by the Orioles every year from 2004 to 2028 because they also have a deferred contract with him. After two more lackluster seasons, one each with the Atlanta Braves and St. Louis Cardinals, he retired at the end of the 2001 season. Through his 16 years in professional baseball, Bonilla accumulated a .279 batting average, with a .358 on-base percentage and a .472 slugging percentage.

== Playing career ==
Bonilla played baseball at Herbert H. Lehman High School in the Bronx and graduated in 1981. He was not selected in the 1981 Major League Baseball draft and spent a semester at New York Institute of Technology in Old Westbury, New York pursuing a degree in computer science. He was signed by the Pittsburgh Pirates after being spotted by scout Syd Thrift at a baseball camp in Europe.

His rise through the Pirates' farm system came to a halt during spring training in 1985 when he broke his right leg in a collision with teammate Bip Roberts. The Chicago White Sox then acquired him through the Rule 5 draft during the 1985–86 offseason, and Bonilla made his major league debut with the White Sox at the start of the 1986 season. Thrift, then the Pirates' general manager, reacquired the unhappy Bonilla in exchange for pitcher José DeLeón later that year. Bonilla also played from 1984 to 1988 with the Mayagüez Indians of the Puerto Rican Winter League.

=== Pittsburgh Pirates ===
Bonilla became the Pirates' starting third baseman in 1987, but after committing 67 errors over his next two seasons, manager Jim Leyland moved him to right field. There he formed a formidable combination alongside stars Barry Bonds and Andy Van Slyke and helped propel the Pittsburgh Pirates to two of their three straight National League East Division titles from 1990 to 1992.

From 1986 to 1991, Bonilla had a .284 batting average, with 868 hits, 191 doubles, 114 home runs, and 500 runs batted in (RBIs). He led the league in extra base hits in 1990, and in doubles in 1991. In those years he placed second and third, respectively, in National League MVP voting. Bonilla also won three Silver Slugger Awards and made the All-Star team four years in a row. On October 28, 1991, he became a free agent.

=== New York Mets ===
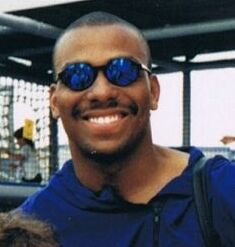
Bonilla at Shea Stadium in 1994

Bonilla signed a five-year, $29 million contract (equivalent to $66.5 million today) with the New York Mets on December 2, 1991. The $6.1 million he received in 1992 was a record for a single season by a margin of $2.3 million. He became the highest-paid player in the National League from 1992 to 1994. However, his offensive production diminished somewhat, finishing with a .278 batting average, 91 home runs, and 277 runs batted in during his three-and-a-half-year tenure with the Mets. Despite this, Bonilla ended up participating in two more All-Star Games (1993 and 1995) and hit a career-high 34 home runs in 1993.

Bonilla's time with the Mets was marked by a contentious relationship with New York baseball media. In his introductory press conference after signing with the organization, he challenged them by stating, "I know you all are gonna try, but you're not gonna be able to wipe the smile off my face." On another occasion, he called the press box during a game to complain about an error that he was charged with.

=== Baltimore Orioles ===
Bonilla was acquired along with a player to be named later (Jimmy Williams on August 16) by the Baltimore Orioles from the Mets in exchange for Damon Buford and Alex Ochoa on July 28, 1995. He helped the Orioles reach the 1996 American League Championship Series.

=== Florida Marlins ===
Following the 1996 season, Bonilla was once again granted free agency, and signed with the Florida Marlins, reuniting with his old manager, Jim Leyland, where he helped the Marlins win the 1997 World Series. He returned to the Marlins for the 1998 season and batted .278 through 28 games.

=== Los Angeles Dodgers ===
On May 14, 1998, the Marlins traded Bonilla to the Los Angeles Dodgers, along with Manuel Barrios, Jim Eisenreich, Charles Johnson, and Gary Sheffield, in exchange for Mike Piazza and Todd Zeile. Bonilla spent the rest of the 1998 season with the Dodgers, batting .237, with seven home runs and 30 runs batted in.

=== New York Mets (second stint) ===
In November 1998, the Mets reacquired Bonilla from the Dodgers in exchange for Mel Rojas. Again, his level of play did not measure up to expectations and he had numerous clashes with manager Bobby Valentine over lack of playing time. His tenure in New York culminated in an incident during the sixth game of the 1999 NLCS during which the Mets were eliminated by the Braves in 11 innings while Bonilla sat in the clubhouse playing cards with teammate Rickey Henderson after the latter asked him to help him relax after he was taken out of the game.

After his subpar 1999 season, the Mets released Bonilla, but still owed him $5.9 million. Bonilla and his agent offered the Mets a deal: Bonilla would defer payment for a decade, and the Mets would pay him an annual paycheck of just over $1.19 million on July 1, starting in 2011 and ending in 2035, adding up to a total payout of $29.8 million. Some fans refer to these payments on July 1 as "Bobby Bonilla Day". Mets owner Fred Wilpon accepted the deal mostly because he was heavily invested with Ponzi scheme operator Bernie Madoff, and the 10 percent returns he thought he was getting on his investments with Madoff outweighed the eight percent interest the Mets would be paying on Bonilla's initial $5.9 million. As a result, the payout was a subject of inquiry during the Madoff investment scandal investigation when it came to light in 2008.

Bonilla also has a deferred-contract plan with the Baltimore Orioles for which he is paid $500,000 a year for 25 years and which began in 2004.

=== Atlanta Braves ===
Bonilla signed with the Atlanta Braves in 2000 and played a mostly uneventful 114 games for them. He achieved his highest batting average (.255) since the 1997 season, although he hit only five home runs, a far cry from his career high of 34.

=== St. Louis Cardinals ===
In 2001, he was signed by the St. Louis Cardinals, but injuries reduced his playing time. He played his final game on October 7, 2001, and finished the season with a .213 average, 37 hits, five home runs, and 21 runs batted in. He retired after the season finished citing "injuries and reduced playing time" as the main reason for his decision. Contrary to common belief that Bonilla's injuries led to Albert Pujols making the Cardinals' roster, manager Tony La Russa stated that Pujols had earned a roster spot before Bonilla's injury issues.

Overall, Bonilla finished his career with one championship, six All-Star appearances, 2,010 hits, 287 home runs, 1,173 runs batted in, and a career .279 batting average.

== Personal life ==
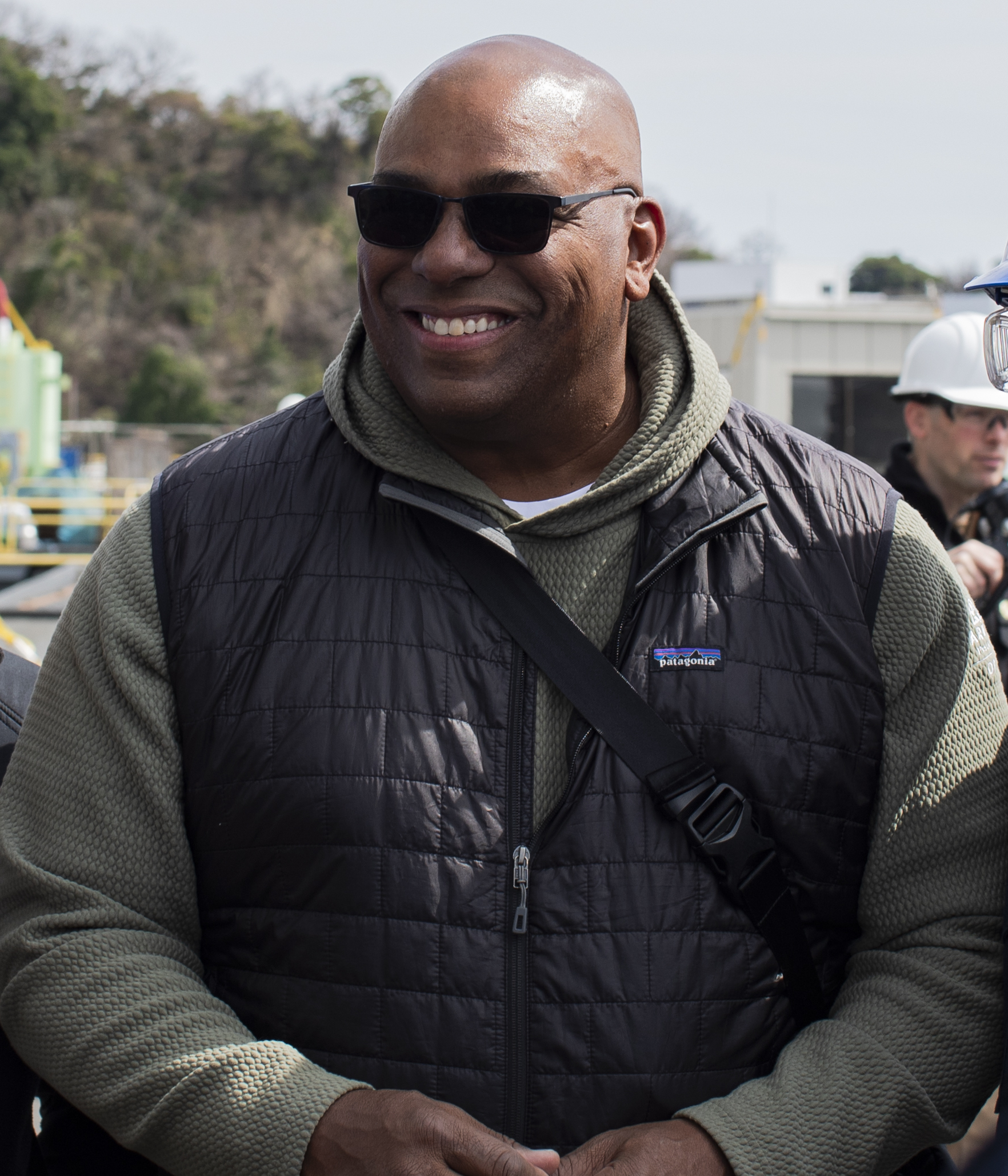
Bonilla in 2025

Bonilla married Migdalia, known as Millie, in 1986. They had met at Herbert Lehman High School in the Bronx. They have two children and divorced in 2009.

== Philanthropy ==
In February 1992, Bonilla and his wife Millie started the Bobby and Millie Bonilla Public School Fund with $35,000. The fund benefits schools attended by Bonilla and his wife by contributing $500 for every run he batted in for the Mets. Bonilla participated in the Players Trust All-Star Golf Tournament, organized by Dave Winfield and Joe Mauer in 2014.

== See also ==
- List of Major League Baseball career home run leaders
- List of Major League Baseball career hits leaders
- List of Major League Baseball career doubles leaders
- List of Major League Baseball career runs scored leaders
- List of Major League Baseball career runs batted in leaders
- List of Major League Baseball annual doubles leaders

Awards and achievements
Preceded by Darryl Strawberry; Will Clark	National League Player of the Month; April & May 1988; April 1990	Succeeded by Will Clark; Andre Dawson
