= Jeff Kubenka =

American baseball player (born 1974)

- Pitcher
- Born: August 24, 1974 (age 50); Weimar, Texas, U.S.
- Batted: Right Threw: Left

Professional debut
- MLB: September 6, 1998, for the Los Angeles Dodgers
- NPB: April 29, 2001, for the Chiba Lotte Marines

Last appearance
- MLB: August 8, 1999, for the Los Angeles Dodgers
- NPB: May 2, 2001, for the Chiba Lotte Marines

MLB statistics
- Win–loss record: 1–1
- earned run average: 5.82
- Strikeouts: 12

NPB statistics
- Win–loss record: 0–1
- earned run average: 18.00
- Strikeouts: 1
- Stats at Baseball Reference

Teams
- Los Angeles Dodgers (1998–1999); Chiba Lotte Marines (2001)

Jeffrey S. Kubenka (born August 24, 1974) was an American Major League Baseball left-handed pitcher. He is an alumnus of St. Mary's University, Texas.

Drafted by the Los Angeles Dodgers in the 38th round of the 1996 MLB amateur draft, Kubenka would make his Major League Baseball debut with the Los Angeles Dodgers on September 6, 1998, and play in his final game on August 8, 1999.

A single in his only at-bat left Kubenka with a rare MLB career batting average of 1.000.
