= Pepe Yñiguez =

Spanish-language baseball broadcaster

Pepe Yñiguez is an American Spanish-language baseball broadcaster for the Los Angeles Dodgers. He joined the Dodgers broadcast team in 1999, teaming with Hall of Fame announcer Jaime Jarrín. For several off-seasons he also hosted "Central Deportiva", a weekly sports talk show on KWKW. He has also broadcast numerous events for Fox Sports International, including the 1997–2005 World Series. He has also broadcast the 1997 Major League Baseball All-Star Game and the Caribbean Series. From 1993-95 he also served as the Spanish radio broadcaster for the Los Angeles Raiders. Beginning with the 2015 season he began calling the Dodgers games on the Spanish language feed of SportsNet LA alongside former Dodgers pitcher Fernando Valenzuela.
