= Glenn Hoffman =

American baseball player, coach, and manager (born 1958)

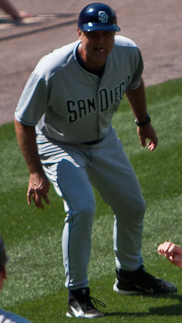
- Hoffman with the San Diego Padres in 2011
- Shortstop / Coach / Manager
- Born: July 7, 1958 (age 67); Orange, California, U.S.
- Batted: Right Threw: Right

MLB debut
- April 12, 1980, for the Boston Red Sox

Last MLB appearance
- September 23, 1989, for the California Angels

MLB statistics
- Batting average: .242
- Home runs: 23
- Runs batted in: 210
- Managerial record: 47–41
- Winning %: .534
- Stats at Baseball Reference

Teams
- As player: Boston Red Sox (1980–1987); Los Angeles Dodgers (1987); California Angels (1989); As manager: Los Angeles Dodgers (1998); As coach: Los Angeles Dodgers (1999–2005); San Diego Padres (2006–2020)

Glenn Edward Hoffman (born July 7, 1958) is an American former professional baseball shortstop, coach, and manager. Hoffman had a nine-year playing career in Major League Baseball (MLB), and served as the manager of the Los Angeles Dodgers for the last 88 games of the season in 1998. A native of Orange, California, he is the older brother of Hall of Fame closer Trevor Hoffman.

== Playing career ==
Hoffman attended Savanna High School of Anaheim, California, and was selected by the Boston Red Sox in the second round of the 1976 June draft. He played primarily at shortstop for the Red Sox from 1980 to 1987, when he was traded to the Dodgers on August 21. In 1988, he returned to the Red Sox' organization as a free agent but spent the entire season in the minor leagues. In 1989, he signed with the California Angels, but was limited to 48 games in his final MLB season. In 766 games played in the Majors, Hoffman collected 524 hits, with 106 doubles, nine triples and 23 home runs. He batted .242.

== Coaching/managing career ==
After his playing career, Hoffman began coaching, and spent 4 1/2 years (1991–1993; 1997–June 21, 1998) as a manager in the Dodger farm system; in between those terms he was field coordinator of instruction for the Dodgers' player development organization.

He was in the midst of his second season as manager of the Triple-A Albuquerque Dukes in 1998 when the parent Dodgers, sitting in third place at 36–38 and 12 1/2 games out of the lead in the National League West Division, fired manager Bill Russell and general manager Fred Claire. Hoffman was named interim manager (with Baseball Hall of Fame skipper Tommy Lasorda taking over the front office reins) on June 22. Hoffman led the Dodgers for the remainder of the season, compiling a 47–41 (.534) win–loss record; the team finished 83–79 and in third place, 15 games behind the eventual NL champion San Diego Padres. Davey Johnson was then named manager for 1999, and Hoffman was retained as third base coach, serving seven full seasons in the post for Johnson and his successor, Jim Tracy.

Hoffman interviewed for the vacant Red Sox managerial job after the 2003 season when Grady Little's contract expired, but Boston instead hired Terry Francona. In 2006, Hoffman became the third base coach for the Padres and served in this role for 15 seasons—working for eight different managers or interim skippers, including Bruce Bochy, Buddy Black and Andy Green. On November 12, 2020, Hoffman retired from coaching and began working for the Padres front office in an advisory role.

== Personal ==
Glenn Hoffman is the older brother of Hall of Fame closer Trevor Hoffman, the former all-time leader in saves, who spent 15 1/2 seasons (1993–2008) with the Padres. Their late father, Ed, was a longtime usher at Anaheim Stadium and a professional singer who would often perform "The Star-Spangled Banner" before Angel games—especially as a "pinch hitter" when the scheduled singer could not appear.

Preceded by Phil Regan	Albuquerque Dukes manager 1997–1998	Succeeded by Ron Roenicke
Preceded by Mark Cresse	Los Angeles Dodgers bullpen coach 1999	Succeeded by Rick Dempsey
Preceded by Joey Amalfitano	Los Angeles Dodgers third base coach 1999–2005	Succeeded by Rich Donnelly
Preceded by Rob Picciolo	San Diego Padres third base coach 2006–2020	Succeeded by Bobby Dickerson
