= Eric Weaver =

American baseball player (born 1973)

- Pitcher
- Born: August 4, 1973 (age 52); Springfield, Illinois, U.S.
- Batted: Right Threw: Right

MLB debut
- May 30, 1998, for the Los Angeles Dodgers

Last MLB appearance
- August 17, 2000, for the Anaheim Angels

MLB statistics
- Win–loss record: 2–3
- Earned run average: 6.27
- Strikeouts: 27
- Stats at Baseball Reference

Teams
- Los Angeles Dodgers (1998); Seattle Mariners (1999); Anaheim Angels (2000)

James Eric Weaver (born August 4, 1973) is an American former professional baseball pitcher. He played in Major League Baseball (MLB) for the Los Angeles Dodgers (1998), Seattle Mariners (1999) and Los Angeles Angels (2000).

Weaver played high school baseball at Illiopolis High School in Illiopolis, Illinois. He played for the U.S. national under-18 team at the 1991 World Junior Baseball Championship, with a 7.72 earned run average in four games for the U.S. He signed with the Los Angeles Dodgers as an undrafted free agent in 1991. In the minor leagues, he threw a no-hitter in 1992 and was a Texas League All-Star in 1996. He had a shoulder injury in 1994, then pitched in the Arizona Fall League in 1995. He worked solely as a relief pitcher for the first time in 1998.

Weaver made his MLB debut with the Dodgers on May 30, 1998. After the season, he was traded to the Mariners for minor leaguer Scott Prouty. Weaver became a free agent after the season and signed with the Angels. He appeared in his final MLB game on August 17, 2000.

Weaver continued to pitch outside the majors through 2003. He spent spring training in 2001 with the San Diego Padres then was released. He signed with Pericos de Puebla of the Mexican Baseball League before joining the Chicago White Sox minor league system in July. He re-signed with the Angels after that season, then was traded to the Philadelphia Phillies, with whom he pitched his final two seasons in the minors.

After his playing career, Weaver was the pitching coach for 10 years at Lincoln Land Community College in his hometown of Springfield, Illinois, then was the pitching coach for his son at Auburn High School in Auburn, Illinois. He also worked at a bank in Springfield.

Weaver and his wife have two children. Then son, after pitching at Auburn, pitched at Lincoln Land, then for the Indiana State Sycamores.
