= Ángel Peña (baseball) =

Dominican baseball player (born 1975)

- Catcher
- Born: February 16, 1975 (age 51); San Pedro de Macorís, Dominican Republic
- Batted: Right Threw: Right

MLB debut
- September 8, 1998, for the Los Angeles Dodgers

Last MLB appearance
- June 1, 2001, for the Los Angeles Dodgers

MLB statistics
- AVG: .209
- Hits: 39
- Strikeouts: 47
- Stats at Baseball Reference

Teams
- Los Angeles Dodgers (1998–1999, 2001); Hanwha Eagles (2004)

Ángel Peña [PAY-nyah] (born February 16, 1975), is a Dominican former professional baseball catcher. He played in Major League Baseball (MLB) for the Los Angeles Dodgers.

== Career ==
Signed by the Los Angeles Dodgers as an amateur free agent in 1992, Peña made his major league debut with the Dodgers on September 8, 1998, and appeared in his final game on June 1, 2001.

At one point in his career, Peña was heralded as the catcher of the future for the Dodgers. He initially was to take the spot of the traded Mike Piazza. However, poor conditioning and the emergence of future All-Star Paul Lo Duca spelled the end of Peña's days as a Dodger, and subsequently as a major league catcher. Pena was released by the Dodgers on October 15, 2001. He briefly played in the San Francisco Giants minor league system and in independent baseball leagues after that but is now out of baseball.
