= Manuel Barrios =

Panamanian baseball player (born 1974)

- Pitcher
- Born: September 21, 1974 (age 51); Cabecera, Panama
- Batted: Right Threw: Right

MLB debut
- September 16, 1997, for the Houston Astros

Last MLB appearance
- July 3, 1998, for the Los Angeles Dodgers

MLB statistics
- Win–loss record: 0–0
- Earned run average: 6.75
- Strikeouts: 4
- Stats at Baseball Reference

Teams
- Houston Astros (1997); Florida Marlins (1998); Los Angeles Dodgers (1998)

Manuel Antonio Barrios (born September 21, 1974) is a Panamanian former Major League Baseball right-handed pitcher for the Los Angeles Dodgers, Houston Astros and Florida Marlins. He pitched in five games during the 1997 and 1998 seasons.
