= 1998 Pittsburgh Pirates season =

1998 Pittsburgh Pirates
- League: National League
- Division: Central
- Ballpark: Three Rivers Stadium
- City: Pittsburgh, Pennsylvania
- Record: 69–93 (.426)
- Divisional place: 6th
- Owners: Kevin McClatchy
- General managers: Cam Bonifay
- Managers: Gene Lamont
- Television: WPGH-TV & WCWB-TV; Fox Sports Net Pittsburgh
- Radio: KDKA-AM (Steve Blass, Greg Brown, Lanny Frattare, Bob Walk)

The 1998 Pittsburgh Pirates season was the 117th season of the franchise; the 112th in the National League. This was their 29th season at Three Rivers Stadium. The Pirates finished sixth and last in the National League Central with a record of 69–93.

== Regular season ==
=== Season standings ===
NL Central
Team	W	L	Pct.	GB	Home	Road
Houston Astros	102	60	.630	—	55‍–‍26	47‍–‍34
Chicago Cubs	90	73	.552	12½	51‍–‍31	39‍–‍42
St. Louis Cardinals	83	79	.512	19	48‍–‍34	35‍–‍45
Cincinnati Reds	77	85	.475	25	39‍–‍42	38‍–‍43
Milwaukee Brewers	74	88	.457	28	38‍–‍43	36‍–‍45
Pittsburgh Pirates	69	93	.426	33	40‍–‍40	29‍–‍53

=== Game log ===
1998 Game Log (69–93)
April (11–16)

#	Date	Opponent	Score	Win	Loss	Save	Attendance	Record
1	April 1	@ Expos	4–0	**Cordova** (1–0)	Perez	—	31,220	1–0
2	April 2	@ Expos	4–3	**Schmidt** (1–0)	Maddux	**Loiselle** (1)	6,396	2–0
3	April 3	@ Mets	1–2	McMichael	**Peters** (0–1)	—	15,245	2–1
4	April 4	@ Mets	6–7 (13)	Wendell	**Peters** (0–2)	—	17,633	2–2
5	April 5	@ Mets	0–7	Yoshii	**Silva** (0–1)	—	18,205	2–3
6	April 6	@ Mets	4–2	**Cordova** (2–0)	Jones	**Loiselle** (2)	13,528	3–3
7	April 7	Braves	3–11	Glavine	**Schmidt** (1–1)	—	43,268	3–4
8	April 8	Braves	5–3	**Loaiza** (1–0)	Neagle	**Loiselle** (3)	11,254	4–4
9	April 9	Braves	3–4	Millwood	**Lieber** (0–1)	Wohlers	9,560	4–5
10	April 10	Marlins	4–1	**Silva** (1–1)	Meadows	**Loiselle** (4)	16,561	5–5
11	April 11	Marlins	7–6 (10)	**Loiselle** (1–0)	Powell	—	19,920	6–5
12	April 12	Marlins	7–3	**Schmidt** (2–1)	Medina	—	12,203	7–5
13	April 13	Marlins	2–7	Larkin	**Loaiza** (1–1)	—	10,938	7–6
14	April 14	@ Braves	0–6	Millwood	**Lieber** (0–2)	—	31,259	7–7
15	April 15	@ Braves	0–7	Maddux	**Silva** (1–2)	—	30,381	7–8
16	April 16	@ Braves	1–3	Smoltz	**Cordova** (2–1)	Wohlers	35,760	7–9
17	April 17	Padres	5–7	Boehringer	**Tabaka** (0–1)	Hoffman	12,555	7–10
18	April 18	Padres	5–7 (10)	Miceli	**Loiselle** (1–1)	Hoffman	14,728	7–11
19	April 21	Giants	3–6	Gardner	**Lieber** (0–3)	—	8,976	7–12
20	April 22	Giants	5–2	**Silva** (2–2)	Darwin	**Loiselle** (5)	11,367	8–12
21	April 23	Giants	7–0	**Cordova** (3–1)	Estes	—	9,899	9–12
22	April 24	@ Padres	4–2	**Schmidt** (3–1)	Smith	**Rincon** (1)	26,413	10–12
23	April 25	@ Padres	3–4 (16)	Reyes	**Martinez** (0–1)	—	53,710	10–13
24	April 26	@ Padres	6–0	**Lieber** (1–3)	Brown	—	42,281	11–13
25	April 27	@ Giants	5–6	Nen	**Loiselle** (1–2)	—	10,127	11–14
26	April 28	@ Giants	1–2	Estes	**Cordova** (3–2)	Nen	11,551	11–15
27	April 30	Dodgers	6–14	Clontz	**Dessens** (0–1)	—	9,728	11–16

May (15–14)

#	Date	Opponent	Score	Win	Loss	Save	Attendance	Record
28	May 1	Dodgers	5–4	**Tabaka** (1–1)	Dreifort	**Loiselle** (6)	15,491	12–16
29	May 2	Dodgers	4–5	Martinez	**Lieber** (1–4)	Radinsky	22,629	12–17
30	May 3	Dodgers	5–10	Park	**Silva** (2–3)	—	18,674	12–18
31	May 5	Cardinals	5–2	**Cordova** (4–2)	Mercker	**Loiselle** (7)	10,329	13–18
32	May 6	Cardinals	5–0	**Schmidt** (4–1)	Stottlemyre	—	12,051	14–18
33	May 7	Reds	8–7	**Dessens** (1–1)	Belinda	**Loiselle** (8)	8,400	15–18
34	May 8	Reds	3–5 (10)	Belinda	**Rincon** (0–1)	Shaw	13,848	15–19
35	May 9	Reds	6–1	**Silva** (3–3)	Winchester	**Peters** (1)	27,185	16–19
36	May 10	Reds	3–4 (12)	Belinda	**Loiselle** (1–3)	—	19,507	16–20
37	May 11	Rockies	5–2	**Schmidt** (5–1)	Ritz	—	9,498	17–20
38	May 12	Rockies	6–0	**Loaiza** (2–1)	Wright	—	12,954	18–20
39	May 13	@ Astros	0–1	Hampton	**Lieber** (1–5)	Wagner	14,239	18–21
40	May 14	@ Astros	7–2	**Silva** (4–3)	Schourek	—	16,123	19–21
41	May 15	@ Diamondbacks	1–6	Suppan	**Cordova** (4–3)	—	43,584	19–22
42	May 16	@ Diamondbacks	6–3	**Schmidt** (6–1)	Anderson	**Loiselle** (9)	48,167	20–22
43	May 17	@ Diamondbacks	2–8	Benes	**Loaiza** (2–2)	—	44,014	20–23
44	May 18	@ Diamondbacks	2–9	Blair	**Lieber** (1–6)	—	41,465	20–24
45	May 19	Padres	3–0	**Silva** (5–3)	Hamilton	**Loiselle** (10)	10,493	21–24
46	May 20	Padres	5–2	**Cordova** (5–3)	Ashby	**Loiselle** (11)	—	22–24
47	May 20	Padres	3–8	Hitchcock	**Peters** (0–3)	—	17,248	22–25
48	May 21	Padres	3–2	**Schmidt** (7–1)	Brown	**Rincon** (2)	10,222	23–25
49	May 22	@ Marlins	1–3	Hernandez	**Loaiza** (2–3)	—	22,057	23–26
50	May 23	@ Marlins	10–4	**Lieber** (2–6)	Fontenot	**Rincon** (3)	30,499	24–26
51	May 24	@ Marlins	3–4	Powell	**Christiansen** (0–1)	—	16,972	24–27
52	May 26	@ Brewers	2–3	Myers	**Loiselle** (1–4)	—	12,272	24–28
53	May 27	@ Brewers	2–3 (10)	Woodall	**Rincon** (0–2)	—	10,274	24–29
54	May 29	Expos	1–4	Perez	**Lieber** (2–7)	Urbina	17,053	24–30
55	May 30	Expos	8–7	**Christiansen** (1–1)	Urbina	—	38,149	25–30
56	May 31	Expos	9–4	**Cordova** (6–3)	Batista	—	24,718	26–30

June (13–14)

#	Date	Opponent	Score	Win	Loss	Save	Attendance	Record
57	June 1	Mets	4–3	**Schmidt** (8–1)	Mlicki	**Rincon** (4)	11,274	27–30
58	June 2	Mets	5–2	**Peters** (1–3)	Bohanon	**Rincon** (5)	9,040	28–30
59	June 3	Mets	3–0	**Lieber** (3–7)	Reed	**Christiansen** (1)	17,691	29–30
60	June 5	Twins	6–1	**Silva** (6–3)	Morgan	—	28,446	30–30
61	June 6	Twins	4–3 (12)	**Loaiza** (3–3)	Aguilera	—	19,809	31–30
62	June 7	Twins	2–3	Serafini	**Schmidt** (8–2)	Aguilera	32,773	31–31
63	June 8	@ Indians	0–8	Colon	**Peters** (1–4)	—	43,068	31–32
64	June 9	@ Indians	7–4	**Lieber** (4–7)	Morman	**Rincon** (6)	41,762	32–32
65	June 10	@ Indians	4–3 (11)	**Loaiza** (4–3)	Mesa	**Loiselle** (12)	43,101	33–32
66	June 12	Brewers	2–4	Karl	**Cordova** (6–4)	Wickman	16,851	33–33
67	June 13	Brewers	1–8	Juden	**Schmidt** (8–3)	—	28,945	33–34
68	June 14	Brewers	7–2	**Peters** (2–4)	Woodard	—	23,755	34–34
69	June 15	@ Phillies	1–2	Beech	**Lieber** (4–8)	Leiter	14,411	34–35
70	June 16	@ Phillies	7–8	Dodd	**Loiselle** (1–5)	—	24,615	34–36
71	June 17	@ Phillies	1–3	Schilling	**Cordova** (6–5)	—	25,694	34–37
72	June 18	@ Brewers	1–0	**Dessens** (2–1)	Jones	**Rincon** (7)	14,774	35–37
73	June 19	@ Brewers	1–2	Woodard	**Peters** (2–5)	Wickman	20,935	35–38
74	June 20	@ Brewers	4–2	**Lieber** (5–8)	Eldred	**Rincon** (8)	28,556	36–38
75	June 21	@ Brewers	8–7	**Loaiza** (5–3)	Juden	**Rincon** (9)	22,338	37–38
76	June 22	White Sox	4–5	Castillo	**Dessens** (2–2)	Karchner	21,531	37–39
77	June 23	White Sox	4–5	Sirotka	**Schmidt** (8–4)	Karchner	20,310	37–40
78	June 24	@ Royals	10–3	**Peters** (3–5)	Rusch	—	18,007	38–40
79	June 25	@ Royals	1–6	Belcher	**Lieber** (5–9)	—	22,504	38–41
80	June 26	@ Dodgers	2–5	Park	**Loaiza** (5–4)	Osuna	52,934	38–42
81	June 27	@ Dodgers	0–2	Valdez	**Cordova** (6–6)	—	37,821	38–43
82	June 28	@ Dodgers	6–4	**Williams** (1–0)	Radinsky	**Loiselle** (13)	38,865	39–43
83	June 30	Tigers	0–3	Moehler	**Lieber** (5–10)	—	11,760	39–44

July (11–15)

#	Date	Opponent	Score	Win	Loss	Save	Attendance	Record
84	July 1	Tigers	1–9	Greisinger	**Peters** (3–6)	—	18,957	39–45
85	July 2	Tigers	5–2	**Loaiza** (6–4)	Powell	**Loiselle** (14)	34,594	40–45
86	July 3	@ Cubs	9–12	Tapani	**Cordova** (6–7)	Beck	40,420	40–46
87	July 4	@ Cubs	4–5	Pisciotta	**Schmidt** (8–5)	Beck	37,780	40–47
88	July 5	@ Cubs	6–7	Stevens	**Loiselle** (1–6)	Beck	38,742	40–48
89	July 10	Phillies	6–7	Schilling	**Cordova** (6–8)	—	18,665	40–49
90	July 11	Phillies	0–1	Portugal	**Loiselle** (1–7)	Leiter	30,084	40–50
91	July 12	Phillies	4–10	Loewer	**Loaiza** (6–5)	—	34,144	40–51
92	July 13	Cubs	6–2	**Lieber** (6–10)	Gonzalez	—	11,772	41–51
93	July 14	Cubs	4–7	Tapani	**Peters** (3–7)	Beck	13,405	41–52
94	July 15	Cubs	3–0	**Cordova** (7–8)	Wood	**Rincon** (10)	28,655	42–52
95	July 16	@ Expos	5–10	Pavano	**Schmidt** (8–6)	Maddux	8,558	42–53
96	July 17	@ Expos	5–1	**Williams** (2–0)	Vazquez	**Christiansen** (2)	9,380	43–53
97	July 18	@ Expos	5–2	**Lieber** (7–10)	Boskie	—	11,499	44–53
98	July 19	@ Expos	6–1	**Peters** (4–7)	Hermanson	—	17,558	45–53
99	July 20	@ Mets	3–1	**Cordova** (8–8)	Yoshii	**Rincon** (11)	18,088	46–53
100	July 21	@ Mets	0–4	Reed	**Schmidt** (8–7)	—	22,844	46–54
101	July 22	Marlins	6–4	**Van Poppel** (1–0)	Dempster	**Christiansen** (3)	13,544	47–54
102	July 23	Marlins	9–1	**Lieber** (8–10)	Meadows	—	11,374	48–54
103	July 24	Braves	0–3	Smoltz	**Peters** (4–8)	—	24,776	48–55
104	July 25	Braves	4–1	**Cordova** (9–8)	Neagle	**Christiansen** (4)	41,568	49–55
105	July 26	Braves	1–2	Maddux	**Schmidt** (8–8)	Ligtenberg	34,925	49–56
106	July 27	@ Rockies	7–8 (13)	Leskanic	**McCurry** (0–1)	—	46,024	49–57
107	July 28	@ Rockies	6–12	Astacio	**Lieber** (8–11)	—	46,856	49–58
108	July 29	@ Rockies	12–1	**Peters** (5–8)	Kile	—	47,411	50–58
109	July 31	Astros	4–7	Hampton	**Cordova** (9–9)	Henry	32,476	50–59

August (14–12)

#	Date	Opponent	Score	Win	Loss	Save	Attendance	Record
110	August 1	Astros	1–2	Lima	**Williams** (2–1)	—	19,783	50–60
111	August 2	Astros	2–6	Johnson	**Christiansen** (1–2)	Elarton	21,201	50–61
112	August 3	Rockies	2–7	Jones	**Lieber** (8–12)	—	11,204	50–62
113	August 4	Rockies	13–5	**Christiansen** (2–2)	Kile	—	15,784	51–62
114	August 5	Rockies	2–6	Wright	**Cordova** (9–10)	—	12,862	51–63
115	August 6	Rockies	1–5	Thomson	**Schmidt** (8–9)	—	14,060	51–64
116	August 7	@ Dodgers	1–3	Bohanon	**Van Poppel** (1–1)	Shaw	41,676	51–65
117	August 8	@ Dodgers	1–2	Osuna	**Christiansen** (2–3)	—	45,187	51–66
118	August 9	@ Dodgers	2–1	**Peters** (6–8)	Park	**Rincon** (12)	43,227	52–66
119	August 11	@ Reds	7–0	**Cordova** (10–10)	Tomko	—	16,399	53–66
120	August 12	@ Reds	5–4	**Schmidt** (9–9)	Remlinger	**Rincon** (13)	16,946	54–66
121	August 13	@ Reds	9–6	**McCurry** (1–1)	Harnisch	**Rincon** (14)	16,002	55–66
122	August 14	@ Cardinals	5–10	Osborne	**Lieber** (8–13)	—	47,836	55–67
123	August 15	@ Cardinals	7–8 (12)	Painter	**McCurry** (1–2)	—	46,817	55–68
124	August 16	@ Cardinals	4–1	**Cordova** (11–10)	Morris	**Lieber** (1)	46,904	56–68
125	August 18	Dodgers	6–4	**Schmidt** (10–9)	Perez	**Loiselle** (15)	12,730	57–68
126	August 19	Dodgers	6–5	**Williams** (3–1)	Bohanon	**Christiansen** (5)	27,259	58–68
127	August 20	Reds	6–5	**Christiansen** (3–3)	Graves	—	13,137	59–68
128	August 21	Reds	14–2	**Peters** (7–8)	Tomko	—	17,007	60–68
129	August 22	Cardinals	14–4	**Cordova** (12–10)	Witt	—	45,082	61–68
130	August 23	Cardinals	4–3	**Schmidt** (11–9)	Mercker	**Christiansen** (6)	42,134	62–68
131	August 24	Cardinals	5–5 (7)	—	—	—	28,435	62–68
132	August 25	@ Diamondbacks	9–6	**Lawrence** (1–0)	Sodowsky	**Loiselle** (16)	38,960	63–68
133	August 26	@ Diamondbacks	4–3	**Tabaka** (2–1)	Daal	**Loiselle** (17)	39,906	64–68
134	August 28	@ Astros	0–2	Johnson	**Cordova** (12–11)	—	40,709	64–69
135	August 29	@ Astros	3–6	Lima	**Schmidt** (11–10)	Powell	41,762	64–70
136	August 30	@ Astros	4–11	Reynolds	**McCurry** (1–3)	—	25,342	64–71

September (5–22)

#	Date	Opponent	Score	Win	Loss	Save	Attendance	Record
137	September 1	Diamondbacks	3–4	Daal	**Peters** (7–9)	Olson	11,427	64–72
138	September 2	Diamondbacks	1–2 (11)	Small	**Tabaka** (2–2)	Olson	12,010	64–73
139	September 3	Diamondbacks	0–1	Anderson	**Cordova** (12–12)	—	8,610	64–74
140	September 4	Cubs	2–5	Karchner	**Williams** (3–2)	Beck	36,510	64–75
141	September 5	Cubs	4–8	Tapani	**Lawrence** (1–1)	Beck	37,711	64–76
142	September 6	Cubs	4–3 (10)	**Loiselle** (2–7)	Stevens	—	22,209	65–76
143	September 7	Brewers	3–6	Roque	**Dessens** (2–3)	Wickman	12,830	65–77
144	September 8	Brewers	8–7	**Williams** (4–2)	Plunk	**Loiselle** (18)	7,171	66–77
145	September 9	@ Cubs	2–4	Clark	**Schmidt** (11–11)	Beck	34,857	66–78
146	September 10	@ Cubs	2–5	Tapani	**Silva** (6–4)	Beck	38,722	66–79
147	September 11	@ Phillies	6–1	**Peters** (8–9)	Loewer	—	16,597	67–79
148	September 12	@ Phillies	4–13	Portugal	**Dessens** (2–4)	—	19,329	67–80
149	September 13	@ Phillies	1–4	Byrd	**Cordova** (12–13)	Leiter	19,662	67–81
150	September 14	@ Cardinals	3–7	Jimenez	**Schmidt** (11–12)	—	42,265	67–82
151	September 15	@ Cardinals	8–6	**Lawrence** (2–1)	Osborne	**Loiselle** (19)	—	68–82
152	September 15	@ Cardinals	3–9	Aybar	**Silva** (6–5)	Acevedo	41,271	68–83
153	September 16	@ Cardinals	0–4	Morris	**Van Poppel** (1–2)	—	39,758	68–84
154	September 18	Astros	2–5	Johnson	**Dessens** (2–5)	Powell	16,937	68–85
155	September 19	Astros	7–1	**Cordova** (13–13)	Lima	—	20,670	69–85
156	September 20	Astros	0–2	Reynolds	**Schmidt** (11–13)	Wagner	23,657	69–86
157	September 21	@ Giants	1–8	Hershiser	**Silva** (6–6)	—	15,695	69–87
158	September 22	@ Giants	2–14	Rueter	**Lieber** (8–14)	—	16,228	69–88
159	September 23	@ Giants	1–4	Gardner	**Peters** (8–10)	Nen	13,915	69–89
160	September 24	@ Giants	2–6	Ortiz	**Dessens** (2–6)	—	16,754	69–90
161	September 25	@ Reds	1–4	Bere	**Cordova** (13–14)	Graves	17,429	69–91
162	September 26	@ Reds	2–6	Harnisch	**Schmidt** (11–14)	White	19,391	69–92
163	September 27	@ Reds	1–4	Tomko	**Silva** (6–7)	—	19,360	69–93

Legend: = Win = Loss = Tie
Bold = Pirates team member

=== Record vs. opponents ===
1998 National League record Source: MLB Standings Grid – 1998
Team	AZ	ATL	CHC	CIN	COL	FLA	HOU	LAD	MIL	MON	NYM	PHI	PIT	SD	SF	STL	AL
Arizona	—	1–8	5–7	4–5	6–6	6–2	4–5	4–8	6–3	2–7	4–5	2–7	6–3	3–9	5–7	2–7	5–8
Atlanta	8–1	—	3–6	7–2	5–3	7–5	4–5	8–1	7–2	6–6	9–3	8–4	7–2	5–4	7–2	6–3	9–7
Chicago	7–5	6–3	—	6–5	7–2	7–2	4–7	4–5	6–6	7–2	4–5	3–6	8–3	5–4	7–3	4–7	5–8
Cincinnati	5–4	2–7	5–6	—	4–5	9–0	3–8	5–4	6–5	8–1	3–6	4–5	5–7	1–11	2–7	8–3	7-6
Colorado	6–6	3–5	2–7	5–4	—	6–3	6–5	6–6	4–7	7–2	3–6	5–4	5–4	5–7	7–5	3–6	4–8
Florida	2–6	5–7	2–7	0–9	3–6	—	3–6	4–5	0–9	5–7	5–7	6–6	3–6	4–5	0–9	4–5	8–8
Houston	5–4	5–4	7–4	8–3	5–6	6–3	—	3–6	9–2	7–2	5–4	7–2	9–2	5–4	6–3	5–7	10–4
Los Angeles	8–4	1–8	5–4	4–5	6–6	5–4	6–3	—	5–4	5–4	3–5	5–4	7–5	5–7	6–6	4–5	8–5
Milwaukee	3–6	2–7	6–6	5–6	7–4	9–0	2–9	4–5	—	6–3	1–8	4–5	6–5	3–6	5–4	3–8	8–6
Montreal	7–2	6–6	2–7	1–8	2–7	7–5	2–7	4–5	3–6	—	8–4	5–7	2–7	4–4	3–6	3–6	6–10
New York	5–4	3–9	5–4	6–3	6–3	7–5	4–5	5–3	8–1	4–8	—	8–4	4–5	4–5	4–5	6–3	9–7
Philadelphia	7-2	4–8	6–3	5–4	4–5	6–6	2–7	4–5	5–4	7–5	4–8	—	8–1	1–8	2–6	3–6	7–9
Pittsburgh	3–6	2–7	3–8	7–5	4–5	6–3	2–9	5–7	5–6	7–2	5–4	1–8	—	5–4	2–7	6–5	6–7
San Diego	9–3	4–5	4–5	11–1	7–5	5–4	4–5	7–5	6–3	4–4	5–4	8–1	4–5	—	8–4	6–3	6–7
San Francisco	7–5	2–7	3–7	7–2	5–7	9–0	3–6	6–6	4–5	6–3	5–4	6–2	7–2	4–8	—	7–5	8–5
St. Louis	7–2	3–6	7–4	3–8	6–3	5-4	7–5	5–4	8–3	6–3	3–6	6–3	5–6	3–6	5–7	—	4–9

=== Detailed records ===
**National League**
Opponent	W	L	WP	RS	RA
**NL East**
Atlanta Braves	2	7	0.222	17	40
Florida Marlins	6	3	0.667	49	33
Montreal Expos	7	2	0.778	47	32
New York Mets	5	4	0.556	26	28
Philadelphia Phillies	1	8	0.111	30	49
Total	21	24	0.467	169	182
**NL Central**
Chicago Cubs	3	8	0.273	46	58
Cincinnati Reds	7	5	0.583	65	48
Houston Astros	2	9	0.182	30	45
Milwaukee Brewers	5	6	0.455	39	44
St. Louis Cardinals	6	5	0.545	63	59
Total	23	33	0.411	243	254
**NL West**
Arizona Diamondbacks	3	6	0.333	28	42
Colorado Rockies	4	5	0.444	54	46
Los Angeles Dodgers	5	7	0.417	44	59
San Diego Padres	5	4	0.556	37	32
San Francisco Giants	2	7	0.222	27	48
Total	19	29	0.396	190	227
**American League**
Chicago White Sox	0	2	0.000	8	10
Cleveland Indians	2	1	0.667	11	15
Detroit Tigers	1	2	0.333	6	14
Kansas City Royals	1	1	0.500	11	9
Minnesota Twins	2	1	0.667	12	7
Total	6	7	0.462	48	55
Season Total	69	93	0.426	650	718

Month	Games	Won	Lost	Win %	RS	RA
April	27	11	16	0.407	101	122
May	29	15	14	0.517	123	113
June	27	13	14	0.481	95	98
July	26	11	15	0.423	121	120
August	26	14	12	0.538	137	122
September	27	5	22	0.185	73	143
Total	162	69	93	0.426	650	718

	Games	Won	Lost	Win %	RS	RA
Home	80	40	40	0.500	354	336
Away	82	29	53	0.354	296	382
Total	162	69	93	0.426	650	718

== Roster ==
1998 Pittsburgh Pirates
Roster
Pitchers: 41 Jason Christiansen; 67 Francisco Córdova; 71 Elmer Dessens; 48 Sean Lawrence; 47 Jon Lieber; 34 Esteban Loaiza; 51 Rich Loiselle; 36 Javier Martínez; 53 Jeff McCurry; 38 Chris Peters; 73 Ricardo Rincón; 22 Jason Schmidt; 56 José Silva; 49 Jeff Tabaka; 57 Todd Van Poppel; 35 Marc Wilkins; 64 Mike Williams	Catchers: 18 Jason Kendall; 27 Tim Laker; 15 Keith Osik; Infielders: 6 Lou Collier; 14 Freddy García; 10 Abraham Núñez; 2 Kevin Polcovich; 16 Aramis Ramírez; 31 Chance Sanford; 17 Doug Strange; 5 Tony Womack; 29 Kevin Young	Outfielders: 46 Jermaine Allensworth; 62 Steve Bieser; 13 Adrian Brown; 19 Emil Brown; 11 José Guillén; 28 Al Martin; 30 Manny Martínez; 25 Mark Smith; 12 Turner Ward	Manager: 32 Gene Lamont; Coaches: 37 Joe Jones (first base); 45 Jack Lind (third base); 23 Lloyd McClendon (hitting); 44 Rick Renick (bench); 50 Pete Vuckovich (pitching); 54 Spin Williams (bullpen)

=== Opening Day lineup ===
Opening Day Starters
#	Name	Position
5	Tony Womack	2B
18	Jason Kendall	C
28	Al Martin	LF
29	Kevin Young	1B
46	Jermaine Allensworth	CF
11	José Guillén	RF
14	Freddy García	3B
6	Lou Collier	SS
67	Francisco Córdova	SP

== Player stats ==
Batting

Note: G = Games played; AB = At bats; H = Hits; Avg. = Batting average; HR = Home runs; RBI = Runs batted in

Regular season
Player	G	AB	H	Avg.	HR	RBI
T. Laker	14	24	9	0.375	1	2
J. Kendall	149	535	175	0.327	12	75
J. Allensworth	69	233	72	0.309	3	24
A. Brown	41	152	43	0.283	0	5
T. Womack	159	655	185	0.282	3	45
S. Bieser	13	11	3	0.273	0	1
K. Young	159	592	160	0.270	27	108
J. Guillén	153	573	153	0.267	14	84
T. Ward	123	282	74	0.262	9	46
E. Brown	13	39	10	0.256	0	3
F. García	56	172	44	0.256	9	26
J. Christiansen	60	4	1	0.250	0	1
M. Martínez	73	180	45	0.250	6	24
T. Van Poppel	18	12	3	0.250	0	1
L. Collier	110	334	82	0.246	2	34
E. Loaiza	21	29	7	0.241	0	3
A. Martin	125	440	105	0.239	12	47
A. Ramírez	72	251	59	0.235	6	24
C. Peters	39	39	9	0.231	0	2
K. Osik	39	98	21	0.214	0	7
M. Smith	59	128	25	0.195	2	13
A. Núñez	24	52	10	0.192	1	2
K. Polcovich	81	212	40	0.189	0	14
D. Strange	90	185	32	0.173	0	14
J. Lieber	29	48	8	0.167	0	1
C. Sanford	14	28	4	0.143	0	3
F. Córdova	33	75	9	0.120	0	1
J. Schmidt	33	62	6	0.097	0	2
J. Silva	18	27	1	0.037	0	0
E. Dessens	43	8	0	0.000	0	1
S. Lawrence	7	6	0	0.000	0	0
J. Martínez	37	1	0	0.000	0	0
R. Rincón	60	2	0	0.000	0	0
J. Tabaka	37	1	0	0.000	0	0
M. Williams	37	3	0	0.000	0	0
R. Loiselle	54	0	0	—	0	0
J. McCurry	16	0	0	—	0	0
M. Wilkins	16	0	0	—	0	0
Team totals	163	5,493	1,395	0.254	107	613

Pitching

Note: G = Games pitched; IP = Innings pitched; W = Wins; L = Losses; ERA = Earned run average; SO = Strikeouts

Regular season
Player	G	IP	W	L	ERA	SO
M. Williams	37	51	4	2	1.94	59
J. Christiansen	60	64 2/3	3	3	2.51	71
R. Rincón	60	65	0	2	2.91	64
J. Tabaka	37	50 2/3	2	2	3.02	40
F. Córdova	33	220 1/3	13	14	3.31	157
R. Loiselle	54	55	2	7	3.44	48
C. Peters	39	148	8	10	3.47	103
M. Wilkins	16	15 1/3	0	0	3.52	17
J. Schmidt	33	214 1/3	11	14	4.07	158
J. Lieber	29	171	8	14	4.11	138
J. Silva	18	100 1/3	6	7	4.40	64
E. Loaiza	21	91 2/3	6	5	4.52	53
J. Martínez	37	41	0	1	4.83	42
T. Van Poppel	18	47	1	2	5.36	32
E. Dessens	43	74 2/3	2	6	5.67	43
J. McCurry	16	19 1/3	1	3	6.52	11
S. Lawrence	7	19 2/3	2	1	7.32	12
Team totals	163	1,449	69	93	3.91	1,112

== Awards and honors ==
1998 Major League Baseball All-Star Game

- Jason Kendall, C, reserve

== Notable transactions ==
- July 17, 1998: Esteban Loaiza was traded by the Pirates to the Texas Rangers for Warren Morris and Todd Van Poppel.

== Farm system ==
Level	Team	League	Manager
AAA	Nashville Sounds	Pacific Coast League	Trent Jewett
AA	Carolina Mudcats	Southern League	Jeff Banister
A	Lynchburg Hillcats	Carolina League	Jeff Richardson and Jeff Livesey
A	Augusta Greenjackets	South Atlantic League	Marty Brown
A-Short Season	Erie SeaWolves	New York–Penn League	Tracy Woodson
Rookie	GCL Pirates	Gulf Coast League	Woody Huyke
