= 1998 Cincinnati Reds season =

1998 Cincinnati Reds
- League: National League
- Division: Central
- Ballpark: Cinergy Field
- City: Cincinnati
- Record: 77–85 (.475)
- Divisional place: 4th
- Owners: Marge Schott
- General managers: Jim Bowden
- Managers: Jack McKeon
- Television: WSTR/WKRC-TV; Fox Sports Ohio (George Grande, Chris Welsh)
- Radio: WLW (Marty Brennaman, Joe Nuxhall)

The 1998 Cincinnati Reds season was the 129th season for the franchise in Major League Baseball, and their 29th and 28th full season at Cinergy Field. The Reds improved on their record of 76–86 from 1997 and finished the season at 77–85, but missed the postseason for the 3rd consecutive season.

== Offseason ==
- November 11, 1997: Paul Bako and Donne Wall were traded by the Reds to the Detroit Tigers for Melvin Nieves.
- November 11, 1997: Mike Kelly was traded by the Reds to the Tampa Bay Devil Rays for a player to be named later. The Devil Rays completed the deal by sending Dmitri Young to the Reds on November 18.
- November 27, 1997: Ricardo Jordan was signed as a free agent by the Reds.
- December 20, 1997: Dave Weathers was selected off waivers by the Cincinnati Reds from the Cleveland Indians.
- January 8, 1998: José Rijo was signed as a free agent by the Reds.
- January 12, 1998: Pete Rose Jr. was signed as a free agent by the Reds.
- March 19, 1998: Midre Cummings was selected off waivers from the Reds by the Boston Red Sox.

== Regular season ==
=== Season standings ===
NL Central
Team	W	L	Pct.	GB	Home	Road
Houston Astros	102	60	.630	—	55‍–‍26	47‍–‍34
Chicago Cubs	90	73	.552	12½	51‍–‍31	39‍–‍42
St. Louis Cardinals	83	79	.512	19	48‍–‍34	35‍–‍45
Cincinnati Reds	77	85	.475	25	39‍–‍42	38‍–‍43
Milwaukee Brewers	74	88	.457	28	38‍–‍43	36‍–‍45
Pittsburgh Pirates	69	93	.426	33	40‍–‍40	29‍–‍53

=== Record vs. opponents ===
1998 National League record Source: MLB Standings Grid – 1998
Team	AZ	ATL	CHC	CIN	COL	FLA	HOU	LAD	MIL	MON	NYM	PHI	PIT	SD	SF	STL	AL
Arizona	—	1–8	5–7	4–5	6–6	6–2	4–5	4–8	6–3	2–7	4–5	2–7	6–3	3–9	5–7	2–7	5–8
Atlanta	8–1	—	3–6	7–2	5–3	7–5	4–5	8–1	7–2	6–6	9–3	8–4	7–2	5–4	7–2	6–3	9–7
Chicago	7–5	6–3	—	6–5	7–2	7–2	4–7	4–5	6–6	7–2	4–5	3–6	8–3	5–4	7–3	4–7	5–8
Cincinnati	5–4	2–7	5–6	—	4–5	9–0	3–8	5–4	6–5	8–1	3–6	4–5	5–7	1–11	2–7	8–3	7-6
Colorado	6–6	3–5	2–7	5–4	—	6–3	6–5	6–6	4–7	7–2	3–6	5–4	5–4	5–7	7–5	3–6	4–8
Florida	2–6	5–7	2–7	0–9	3–6	—	3–6	4–5	0–9	5–7	5–7	6–6	3–6	4–5	0–9	4–5	8–8
Houston	5–4	5–4	7–4	8–3	5–6	6–3	—	3–6	9–2	7–2	5–4	7–2	9–2	5–4	6–3	5–7	10–4
Los Angeles	8–4	1–8	5–4	4–5	6–6	5–4	6–3	—	5–4	5–4	3–5	5–4	7–5	5–7	6–6	4–5	8–5
Milwaukee	3–6	2–7	6–6	5–6	7–4	9–0	2–9	4–5	—	6–3	1–8	4–5	6–5	3–6	5–4	3–8	8–6
Montreal	7–2	6–6	2–7	1–8	2–7	7–5	2–7	4–5	3–6	—	8–4	5–7	2–7	4–4	3–6	3–6	6–10
New York	5–4	3–9	5–4	6–3	6–3	7–5	4–5	5–3	8–1	4–8	—	8–4	4–5	4–5	4–5	6–3	9–7
Philadelphia	7–2	4–8	6–3	5–4	4–5	6–6	2–7	4–5	5–4	7–5	4–8	—	8–1	1–8	2–6	3–6	7–9
Pittsburgh	3–6	2–7	3–8	7–5	4–5	6–3	2–9	5–7	5–6	7–2	5–4	1–8	—	5–4	2–7	6–5	6–7
San Diego	9–3	4–5	4–5	11–1	7–5	5–4	4–5	7–5	6–3	4–4	5–4	8–1	4–5	—	8–4	6–3	6–7
San Francisco	7–5	2–7	3–7	7–2	5–7	9–0	3–6	6–6	4–5	6–3	5–4	6–2	7–2	4–8	—	7–5	8–5
St. Louis	7–2	3–6	7–4	3–8	6–3	5-4	7–5	5–4	8–3	6–3	3–6	6–3	5–6	3–6	5–7	—	4–9

=== Notable transactions ===
- April 8, 1998: Buddy Carlyle was traded by the Cincinnati Reds to the San Diego Padres for Marc Kroon.
- June 24, 1998: Dave Weathers was selected off waivers by the Milwaukee Brewers from the Cincinnati Reds.
- July 4, 1998: Jeff Shaw was traded by the Reds to the Los Angeles Dodgers for Paul Konerko and Dennys Reyes.
- July 21, 1998: Jason Bere was signed as a free agent by the Reds.

==== Draft picks ====
- June 2, 1998: Adam Dunn was drafted by the Reds in the 2nd round of the 1998 Major League Baseball draft. Player signed June 11, 1998.
- June 2, 1998: Termel Sledge was drafted by the Cincinnati Reds in the 45th round of the 1998 amateur draft, but did not sign.

=== Roster ===
1998 Cincinnati Reds
Roster
Pitchers: 37 Stan Belinda; 51 Jason Bere; 26 Steve Cooke; 54 Keith Glauber; 32 Danny Graves; 38 Pete Harnisch; 33 John Hudek; 45 Mark Hutton; 48 Ricardo Jordan; 56 Scott Klingenbeck; 48 Rick Krivda; 33 Marc Kroon; 58 Steve Parris; 51 Eddie Priest; 43 Mike Remlinger; 49 Dennys Reyes; 41 Jeff Shaw; 31 Scott Sullivan; 40 Brett Tomko; 49 David Weathers; 36 Gabe White; 53 Todd Williams; 44 Scott Winchester	Catchers: 6 Brook Fordyce; 62 Guillermo Garcia; 10 Eddie Taubensee; Infielders: 17 Aaron Boone; 29 Bret Boone; 21 Sean Casey; 12 Willie Greene; 4,12 Damian Jackson; 28 Paul Konerko; 11 Barry Larkin; 70 Stephen Larkin; 39 Eduardo Pérez; 57 Roberto Petagine; 3 Pokey Reese	Outfielders: 34 Mike Frank; 4 Jeffrey Hammonds; 28 Lenny Harris; 46 Melvin Nieves; 22 Jon Nunnally; 16 Reggie Sanders; 23 Chris Stynes; 45 Tony Tarasco; 9 Pat Watkins; 25 Dmitri Young	Manager: 15 Jack McKeon; Coaches: 2 Harry Dunlop (third base); 30 Ken Griffey, Sr. (hitting); 35 Don Gullett (pitching); 47 Tom Hume (bullpen); 19 Denis Menke (bench); 7 Ron Oester (first base)

== Player stats ==
=== Batting ===
==== Starters by position ====
- Note: Pos = Position; G = Games played; AB = At bats; H = Hits; Avg. = Batting average; HR = Home runs; RBI = Runs batted in

Pos	Player	G	AB	H	Avg.	HR	RBI
C	Ed Taubensee	130	491	120	.278	11	72
1B	Sean Casey	96	351	82	.272	7	52
2B	Bret Boone	157	648	155	.266	24	95
SS	Barry Larkin	145	626	166	.309	17	72
3B	Willie Greene	111	417	96	.270	14	49
LF	Dmitri Young	144	590	166	.310	14	83
CF	Reggie Sanders	135	481	129	.268	14	59
RF	Jon Nunnally	74	213	36	.207	7	20

- Stats through the end of the 1998 season

==== Other batters ====
- Note: G = Games played; AB = At bats; H = Hits; Avg. = Batting average; HR = Home runs; RBI = Runs batted in

Player	G	AB	H	Avg.	HR	RBI
Chris Stynes	123	347	88	.254	6	27
Aaron Boone	58	181	51	.282	2	28
Eduardo Pérez	84	172	41	.238	4	30
Pat Watkins	83	147	39	.265	2	15
Brook Fordyce	57	146	37	.253	3	14
Pokey Reese	59	133	34	.256	1	16
Lenny Harris	57	122	36	.295	0	10
Melvin Nieves	83	119	30	.252	2	17
Mike Frank	28	89	20	.225	0	7
Jeffrey Hammonds	26	86	26	.302	0	11
Paul Konerko	26	73	16	.219	3	13
Roberto Petagine	34	62	16	.258	3	7
Damian Jackson	13	38	12	.316	0	7
Guillermo Garcia	12	36	7	.194	2	4
Tony Tarasco	15	24	5	.208	1	4
Stephen Larkin	1	3	1	.333	0	0

=== Pitching ===
==== Starting pitchers ====
- Note: G = Games pitched; IP = Innings pitched; W = Wins; L = Losses; ERA = Earned run average; SO = Strikeouts

Player	G	IP	W	L	ERA	SO
Brett Tomko	34	210.2	13	12	4.44	162
Pete Harnisch	32	209.0	14	7	3.14	157
Mike Remlinger	35	164.1	8	15	4.82	144
Steve Parris	18	99.0	6	5	3.73	77
Scott Winchester	16	79.0	3	6	5.81	40
Jason Bere	9	43.2	3	2	4.12	31
Dennys Reyes	8	38.2	3	1	4.42	44
Scott Klingenbeck	4	22.2	1	3	5.96	13
Eddie Priest	2	6.0	0	1	10.50	1
Steve Cooke	1	6.0	1	0	1.50	3

==== Other pitchers ====
- Note: G = Games pitched; IP = Innings pitched; W = Wins; L = Losses; ERA = Earned run average; SO = Strikeouts

Player	G	IP	W	L	ERA	SO
David Weathers	16	62.1	2	4	6.21	51

==== Relief pitchers ====
- Note: G = Games pitched; W = Wins; L = Losses; SV = Saves; ERA = Earned run average; SO = Strikeouts

Player	G	W	L	SV	ERA	SO
Jeff Shaw	39	2	4	23	1.81	29
Gabe White	69	5	5	9	4.01	83
Scott Sullivan	67	5	5	1	5.21	86
Danny Graves	62	2	1	8	3.32	44
Stan Belinda	40	4	8	1	3.23	57
John Hudek	30	4	2	0	2.43	40
Rick Krivda	16	0	2	0	11.28	19
Mark Hutton	10	0	1	0	7.41	3
Todd Williams	6	0	1	0	7.71	4
Ricardo Jordan	6	1	0	0	24.30	1
Marc Kroon	4	0	0	0	13.50	4
Keith Glauber	3	0	0	0	2.35	4
Lenny Harris	1	0	0	0	0.00	1

== Farm system ==
Level	Team	League	Manager
AAA	Indianapolis Indians	International League	Dave Miley
AA	Chattanooga Lookouts	Southern League	Mark Berry
A	Burlington Bees	Midwest League	Phillip Wellman
A	Charleston Alley Cats	South Atlantic League	Barry Lyons
Rookie	Billings Mustangs	Pioneer League	Russ Nixon
