= 1998 Florida Marlins season =

1998 Florida Marlins
- League: National League
- Division: East
- Ballpark: Pro Player Stadium
- City: Miami Gardens, Florida
- Record: 54–108 (.333)
- Divisional place: 5th
- Owners: Wayne Huizenga
- General managers: Dave Dombrowski
- Managers: Jim Leyland
- Television: Sports Channel Florida; WBFS-TV (Joe Angel, Dave O'Brien, Tommy Hutton, Jay Randolph)
- Radio: WQAM (Joe Angel, Dave O'Brien, Jon Sciambi); WQBA (Spanish) (Felo Ramírez, Manolo Alvarez)

The 1998 Florida Marlins season was the sixth season for the Major League Baseball (MLB) franchise in the National League. It would begin with the team attempting to defend their World Series Champion title, having won the title in 1997. Their manager was Jim Leyland. They played home games at Pro Player Stadium, and finished with a record of 54–108, the worst record in all of baseball. The team is notable for having arguably the biggest fire sale in sports history, auctioning off nearly all of their most notable players. The 1998 Marlins were the first defending World Series champions to finish last in their division and the first to lose 100 games. To make matters more embarrassing, their record that season was worse than both of that year's expansion teams, the Tampa Bay Devil Rays and the Arizona Diamondbacks, who also finished last in their own divisions (the AL East and NL West respectively), were nine and eleven games better than the Marlins, at 63–99 and 65-97 respectively.

The Marlins won on opening day against the Chicago Cubs, but it would be the only time they were over .500 all season. They promptly lost 11 straight, the most consecutive losses by a reigning champion. By the end of May, they were 17–38, 21 games under .500, and their season was all but over. The Marlins would finish 0–9 against three teams: Cincinnati, San Francisco, and Milwaukee. The 1998 Marlins are the most recent team to finish winless against three separate opponents.

== Offseason ==
- November 18, 1997: Devon White was traded by the Florida Marlins to the Arizona Diamondbacks for Jesus Martinez (minors).
- December 15, 1997: Scott Podsednik was drafted by the Texas Rangers from the Florida Marlins in the 1997 rule 5 draft.
- December 15, 1997: Derrek Lee was traded by the San Diego Padres with Steve Hoff (minors) and Rafael Medina to the Florida Marlins for Kevin Brown.
- December 21, 1997: Kevin Millar was signed as a free agent with the Florida Marlins.

== Regular season ==
=== Opening Day starters ===
15	Cliff Floyd	LF
16	Edgar Renteria	SS
3	Ryan Jackson	1B
10	Gary Sheffield	RF
7	Mark Kotsay	CF
23	Charles Johnson	C
30	Craig Counsell	2B
2	Josh Booty	3B
61	Livan Hernandez	P

=== Season standings ===
NL East
Team	W	L	Pct.	GB	Home	Road
Atlanta Braves	106	56	.654	—	56‍–‍25	50‍–‍31
New York Mets	88	74	.543	18	47‍–‍34	41‍–‍40
Philadelphia Phillies	75	87	.463	31	40‍–‍41	35‍–‍46
Montreal Expos	65	97	.401	41	39‍–‍42	26‍–‍55
Florida Marlins	54	108	.333	52	31‍–‍50	23‍–‍58

=== Record vs. opponents ===
1998 National League record Source: MLB Standings Grid – 1998
Team	AZ	ATL	CHC	CIN	COL	FLA	HOU	LAD	MIL	MON	NYM	PHI	PIT	SD	SF	STL	AL
Arizona	—	1–8	5–7	4–5	6–6	6–2	4–5	4–8	6–3	2–7	4–5	2–7	6–3	3–9	5–7	2–7	5–8
Atlanta	8–1	—	3–6	7–2	5–3	7–5	4–5	8–1	7–2	6–6	9–3	8–4	7–2	5–4	7–2	6–3	9–7
Chicago	7–5	6–3	—	6–5	7–2	7–2	4–7	4–5	6–6	7–2	4–5	3–6	8–3	5–4	7–3	4–7	5–8
Cincinnati	5–4	2–7	5–6	—	4–5	9–0	3–8	5–4	6–5	8–1	3–6	4–5	5–7	1–11	2–7	8–3	7-6
Colorado	6–6	3–5	2–7	5–4	—	6–3	6–5	6–6	4–7	7–2	3–6	5–4	5–4	5–7	7–5	3–6	4–8
Florida	2–6	5–7	2–7	0–9	3–6	—	3–6	4–5	0–9	5–7	5–7	6–6	3–6	4–5	0–9	4–5	8–8
Houston	5–4	5–4	7–4	8–3	5–6	6–3	—	3–6	9–2	7–2	5–4	7–2	9–2	5–4	6–3	5–7	10–4
Los Angeles	8–4	1–8	5–4	4–5	6–6	5–4	6–3	—	5–4	5–4	3–5	5–4	7–5	5–7	6–6	4–5	8–5
Milwaukee	3–6	2–7	6–6	5–6	7–4	9–0	2–9	4–5	—	6–3	1–8	4–5	6–5	3–6	5–4	3–8	8–6
Montreal	7–2	6–6	2–7	1–8	2–7	7–5	2–7	4–5	3–6	—	8–4	5–7	2–7	4–4	3–6	3–6	6–10
New York	5–4	3–9	5–4	6–3	6–3	7–5	4–5	5–3	8–1	4–8	—	8–4	4–5	4–5	4–5	6–3	9–7
Philadelphia	7-2	4–8	6–3	5–4	4–5	6–6	2–7	4–5	5–4	7–5	4–8	—	8–1	1–8	2–6	3–6	7–9
Pittsburgh	3–6	2–7	3–8	7–5	4–5	6–3	2–9	5–7	5–6	7–2	5–4	1–8	—	5–4	2–7	6–5	6–7
San Diego	9–3	4–5	4–5	11–1	7–5	5–4	4–5	7–5	6–3	4–4	5–4	8–1	4–5	—	8–4	6–3	6–7
San Francisco	7–5	2–7	3–7	7–2	5–7	9–0	3–6	6–6	4–5	6–3	5–4	6–2	7–2	4–8	—	7–5	8–5
St. Louis	7–2	3–6	7–4	3–8	6–3	5-4	7–5	5–4	8–3	6–3	3–6	6–3	5–6	3–6	5–7	—	4–9

=== Notable transactions ===
- April 15, 1998: Jacob Brumfield was signed as a free agent with the Florida Marlins.

==== The Mike Piazza trades ====
- May 14, 1998: Mike Piazza was traded by the Los Angeles Dodgers with Todd Zeile to the Florida Marlins for Manuel Barrios, Bobby Bonilla, Jim Eisenreich, Charles Johnson, and Gary Sheffield.
- May 22, 1998: Mike Piazza was traded by the Florida Marlins to the New York Mets for Preston Wilson, Ed Yarnall, and Geoff Goetz (minors).

=== Citrus Series ===
The first interleague game between the Florida Marlins and the Tampa Bay Devil Rays took place at Tropicana Field. The rivalry would be known as the Citrus Series. The Marlins won the game in twelve innings by a score of 3–2 and would go on to win the season series 3 games to 1.

- June 22 - Marlins @ Devil Rays: 3 – 2
- June 23 - Marlins @ Devil Rays: 4 – 6
- June 24 - Marlins vs Devil Rays: 8 – 4
- June 25 - Marlins vs Devil Rays: 5 – 1

=== Roster ===
1998 Florida Marlins
Roster
Pitchers: 57 Antonio Alfonseca; 48 Manuel Barrios; 20,40 Vic Darensbourg; 50 Ryan Dempster; 20 Brian Edmondson; 54 Joe Fontenot; 46,60 Gabe González; 40 Chris Hammond; 41 Oscar Henríquez; 49 Félix Heredia; 61 Liván Hernández; 36 Andy Larkin; 43 Eric Ludwick; 33 Matt Mantei; 34 Brian Meadows; 47 Rafael Medina; 24 Kirt Ojala; 44 Donn Pall; 39 Jay Powell; 21 Jesus Sánchez; 51 Justin Speier; 38 Rob Stanifer	Catchers: 23 Charles Johnson; 4 Randy Knorr; 31 Mike Piazza; 52 Mike Redmond; 9 Gregg Zaun; Infielders: 13,58 Dave Berg; 25 Bobby Bonilla; 2 Josh Booty; 1 Luis Castillo; 30 Craig Counsell; 39 Brian Daubach; 8 Jim Eisenreich; 22 Álex González; 3 Ryan Jackson; 27,25 Derrek Lee; 18 Kevin Millar; 27 Kevin Orie; 16 Édgar Rentería; 19 John Roskos; 25,27 Todd Zeile	Outfielders: 28 John Cangelosi; 17 Todd Dunwoody; 15 Cliff Floyd; 4,7 Mark Kotsay; 10 Gary Sheffield; 14 John Wehner; 8 Preston Wilson	Manager: 11 Jim Leyland; Coaches: 6 Lorenzo Bundy (Bench); 45 Rich Donnelly (3rd Base); 31 Rich Dubee (Pitching); 12 Bruce Kimm (Bullpen); 29 Milt May (Hitting); 37 Tommy Sandt (1st Base)

== Player stats ==
= Indicates team leader

=== Batting ===
==== Starters by position ====
Note: Pos = Position; G = Games played; AB = At bats; R = Runs; H = Hits; HR = Home runs; RBI = Runs batted in; Avg. = Batting average; SB = Stolen bases

Pos	Player	G	AB	R	H	HR	RBI	Avg.	SB
C	Gregg Zaun	106	298	19	56	5	29	.188	5
1B	Derrek Lee	141	454	62	106	17	74	.233	5
2B	Craig Counsell	107	335	43	84	4	40	.251	3
3B	Todd Zeile	66	234	37	68	6	39	.291	2
SS	Édgar Rentería	133	517	79	146	3	31	.282	41
LF	Cliff Floyd	153	588	85	166	22	90	.282	27
CF	Todd Dunwoody	116	434	53	109	5	28	.251	5
RF	Mark Kotsay	154	578	72	161	11	68	.279	10

==== Other batters ====
Note: G = Games played; AB = At bats; R = Runs; H = Hits; HR = Home runs; RBI = Runs batted in; Avg. = Batting average; SB = Stolen bases

Player	G	AB	R	H	HR	RBI	Avg.	SB
Dave Berg	81	182	18	57	2	21	.313	3
Bobby Bonilla	28	97	11	27	4	15	.278	0
Josh Booty	7	19	0	3	0	3	.158	0
John Cangelosi	104	171	19	43	1	10	.251	2
Luis Castillo	44	153	21	31	1	10	.203	3
Brian Daubach	10	15	0	3	0	3	.200	0
Jim Eisenreich	30	64	9	16	1	7	.250	2
Alex Gonzalez	25	86	11	13	3	7	.151	0
Ryan Jackson	111	260	26	65	5	31	.250	1
Charles Johnson	31	113	13	25	7	23	.221	0
Randy Knorr	15	49	4	10	2	11	.204	0
Kevin Millar	2	2	1	1	0	0	.500	0
Kevin Orie	48	175	23	46	6	17	.263	1
Mike Piazza	5	18	1	5	0	5	.278	0
Mike Redmond	37	118	10	39	2	12	.331	0
John Roskos	10	10	1	1	0	0	.100	0
Gary Sheffield	40	136	21	37	6	28	.272	4
John Wehner	53	88	10	20	0	5	.227	1
Preston Wilson	14	31	4	2	1	1	.065	0

=== Pitching ===
==== Starting pitchers ====
Note: G = Games pitched; IP = Innings pitched; W = Wins; L = Losses; ERA = Earned run average; SO = Strikeouts

Player	G	IP	W	L	ERA	SO
Liván Hernández	33	234.1	10	12	4.72	162
Brian Meadows	31	174.1	11	13	5.21	88
Jesús Sánchez	35	173.0	7	9	4.47	137
Andy Larkin	17	74.2	3	8	9.64	43
Rafael Medina	12	67.1	2	6	6.01	49
Joe Fontenot	8	42.2	0	7	6.33	24
Chris Hammond	3	13.2	0	2	6.59	8

==== Relief pitchers ====
Note: G = Games pitched; IP = Innings pitched; W = Wins; L = Losses; ERA = Earned run average; SO = Strikeouts; SV = Saves

Player	G	IP	W	L	ERA	SO	SV
Antonio Alfonseca	58	70.2	4	6	4.08	46	8
Vic Darensbourg	59	71.0	0	7	3.68	74	1
Brian Edmondson	43	59.1	4	3	3.79	32	0
Oscar Henriquez	15	20.0	0	0	8.55	19	0
Felix Heredia	41	41.0	0	3	5.49	38	2
Matt Mantei	42	54.2	3	4	2.96	63	9
Donn Pall	23	33.1	0	1	5.13	26	0
Jay Powell	33	36.1	4	4	4.21	24	3
Justin Speier	18	19.1	0	3	8.38	15	0
Rob Stanifer	38	48.0	2	4	5.63	30	1
Manuel Barrios	2	2.2	0	0	3.38	1	0
Gabe Gonzalez	3	1.0	0	0	9.00	0	0

==== Other pitchers ====
Note: G = Games pitched; IP = Innings pitched; W = Wins; L = Losses; ERA = Earned run average; SO = Strikeouts; SV = Saves

Player	G	IP	W	L	ERA	SO	SV
Kirt Ojala	41	125.0	2	7	4.25	75	0
Ryan Dempster	14	54.2	1	5	7.08	35	0
Eric Ludwick	13	32.2	1	4	7.44	27	0

== Farm system ==
Level	Team	League	Manager
AAA	Charlotte Knights	International League	Fredi González
AA	Portland Sea Dogs	Eastern League	Lynn Jones
A	Brevard County Manatees	Florida State League	Rick Renteria
A	Kane County Cougars	Midwest League	Juan Bustabad
A-Short Season	Utica Blue Sox	New York–Penn League	Ken Joyce
Rookie	GCL Marlins	Gulf Coast League	Jon Deeble
