= 1998 Major League Baseball home run record chase =

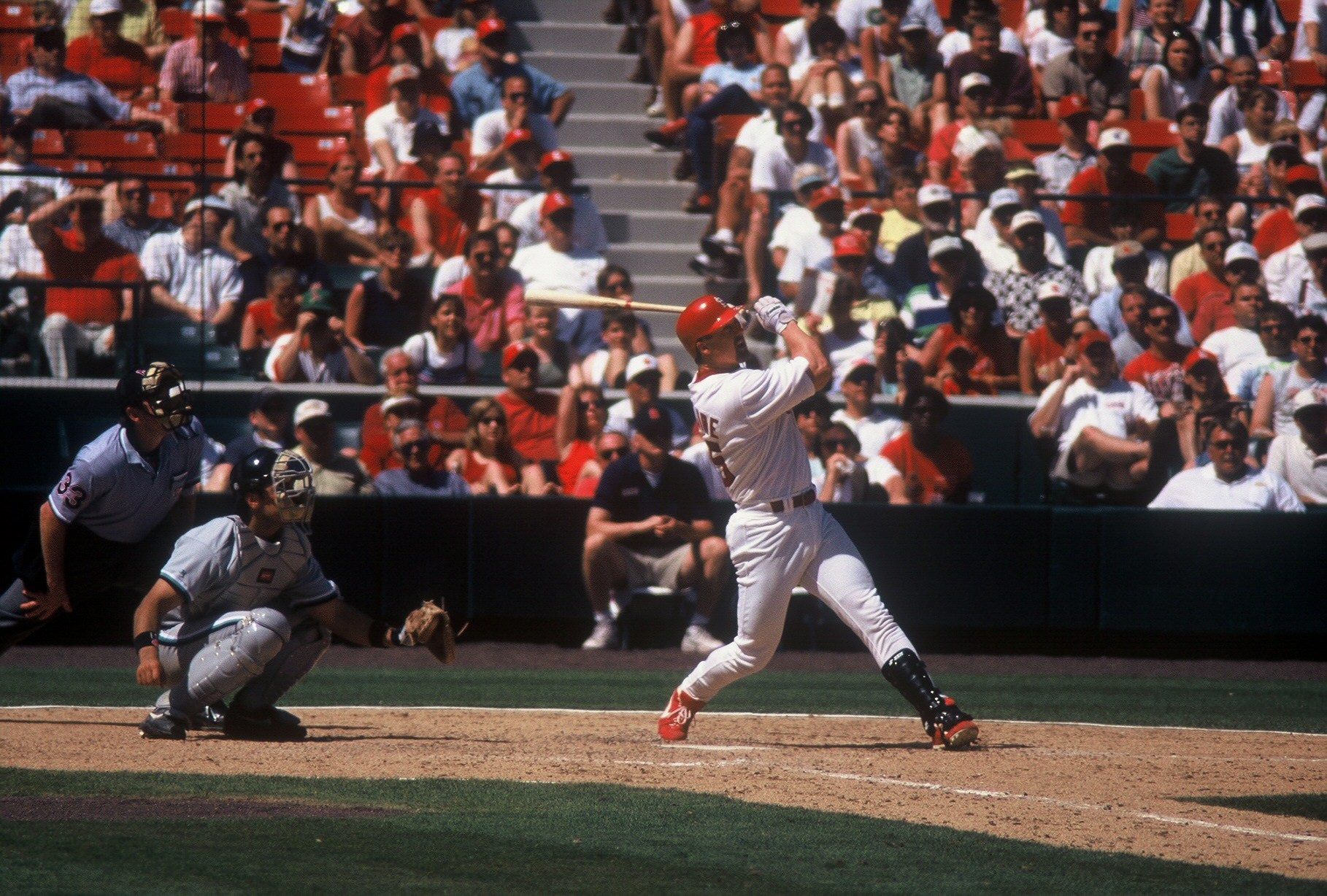
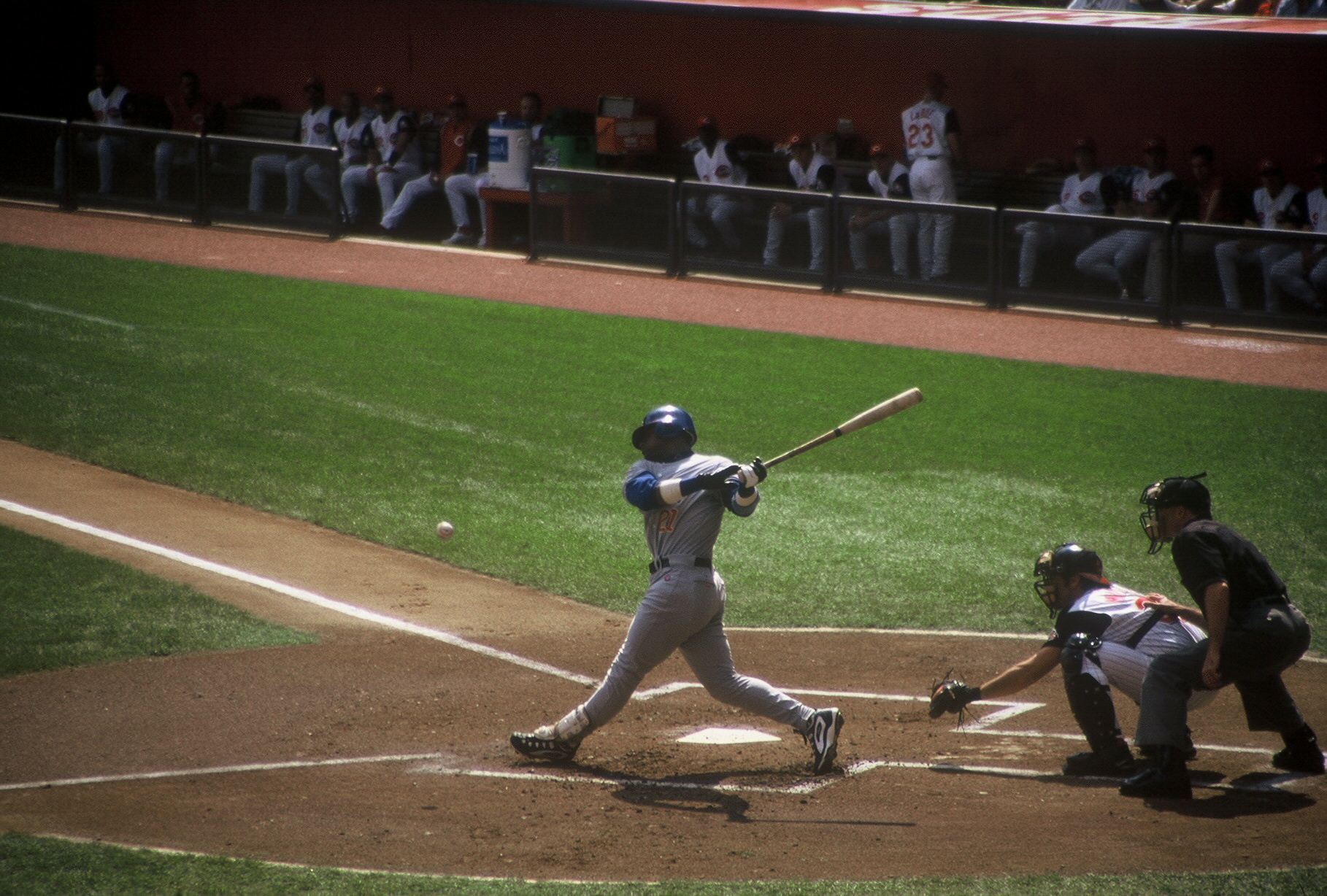
Mark McGwire and Sammy Sosa

During Major League Baseball's (MLB) 1998 season, Mark McGwire of the St. Louis Cardinals and Sammy Sosa of the Chicago Cubs pursued the league's long-standing and highly coveted single-season home run record (61), set in 1961 by Roger Maris. The season-long chase culminated on September 8, 1998, when McGwire, facing Sosa and the Cubs, hit his 62nd home run of the season to break the record. McGwire finished the season with 70 home runs, while Sosa finished with 66. The 1998 home run record chase, as well the previous year's pursuit of the record, was widely credited by sports analysts with restoring interest in MLB among its fan base following the 1994 strike that resulted in that season prematurely ending and the cancellation of the 1994 World Series. McGwire's record was later broken in 2001 by Barry Bonds, who hit 73 home runs.

Several players had come close to breaking Maris's record in the years before 1998. Before the 1994 season was cut short, Matt Williams of the San Francisco Giants and Ken Griffey Jr. of the Seattle Mariners were both on a pace which threatened Maris's record: they hit 43 and 40 home runs respectively in a season which was shortened by approximately 50 of the scheduled 162 games. In 1995, Albert Belle became the first player since Cecil Fielder in 1990 to hit 50 home runs in a season. Belle was only the 4th player in the previous three decades to reach the 50 home run milestone (George Foster hit 52 in 1977, following Willie Mays in 1965). In 1996, Brady Anderson of the Baltimore Orioles hit 50 home runs, twice the number he hit during any other season. Of more note was McGwire of the Oakland Athletics, who first drew attention by hitting a league-leading 52 home runs that season while only playing in 130 games.

The 1997 home run chase featured McGwire and Griffey, but neither reached it that year. It was during that season that full-fledged interest over the record kicked in as both players were on record pace well into the summer. McGwire finished the 1997 season with 58 home runs following his mid-season trade to the Cardinals, besting Griffey's total of 56 that year.

== Breaking the record ==
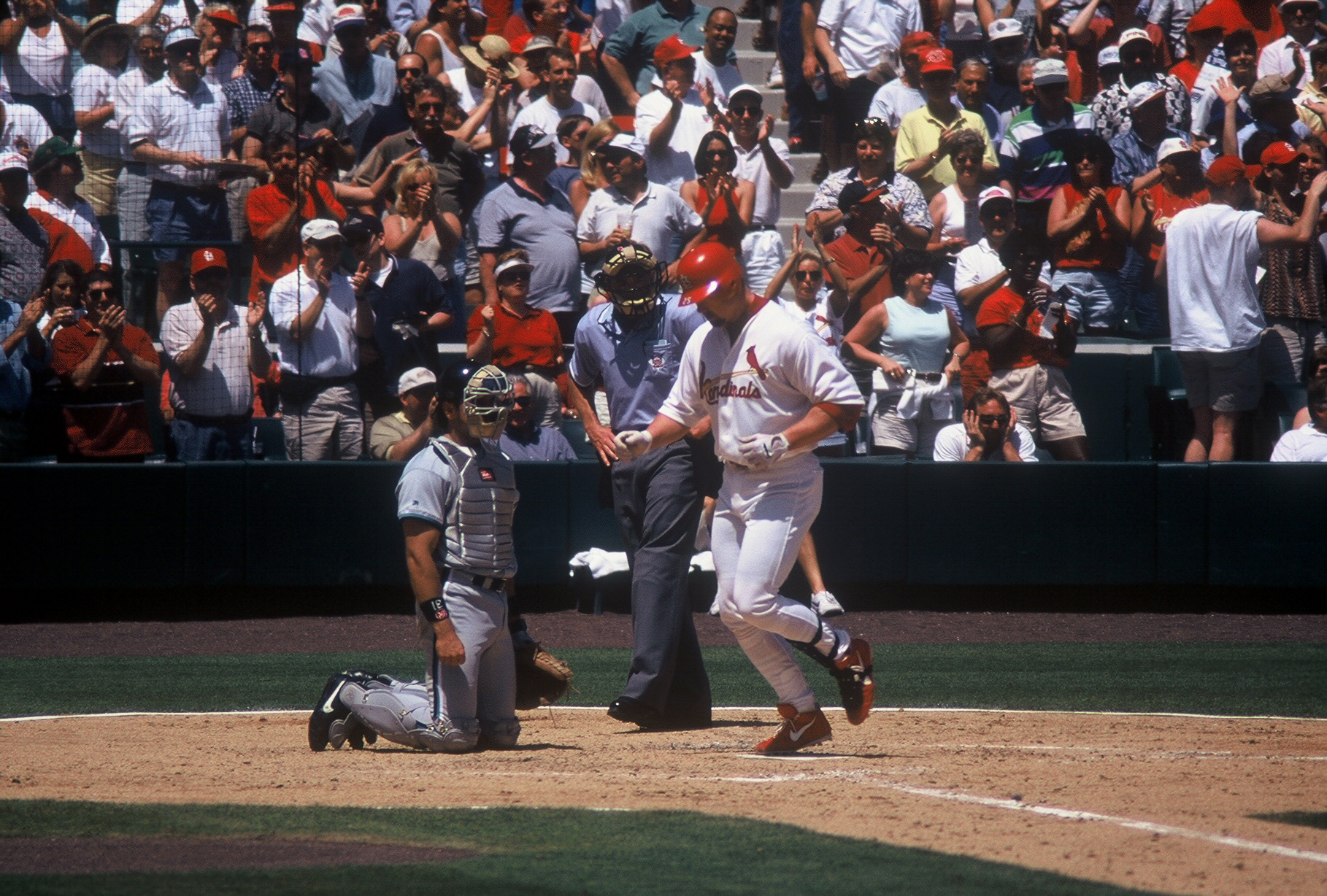
McGwire crossing home plate on May 18, 1998, for his 17th home run of the season

Speculation on the potential of McGwire or Griffey breaking Roger Maris' home run record was a popular story heading into spring training, and was even promoted by MLB, in an effort to draw fans back to the game who felt disenfranchised by the 1994 strike that prematurely ended the season and led to the cancellation of the World Series. With the spotlight still on Griffey and McGwire (entering his first full season as a Cardinal), the latter opened the 1998 season by hitting home runs in each of his first four games. McGwire would ultimately find himself ahead of record pace for all but two games of the season; his pace hit a low of 58.9 on May 7 following a five-game drought. After hitting 16 home runs in May (only two short of Rudy York's ill-fated record of 18 home runs in August 1937), McGwire led the league with 27 home runs, ahead of Griffey's 19 and on pace for more than 80.

June, however, would be Sosa's month to catch up. His 13 home runs entering the month represented less than half of rival McGwire's total. Sosa had his first of four multi-home run games that month on June 1, and went on to break Rudy York's record with 20 home runs in the month of June, a record that still stands. By the end of his historic month, the outfielder's 33 home runs tied him with Griffey and left him only four behind McGwire's 37.

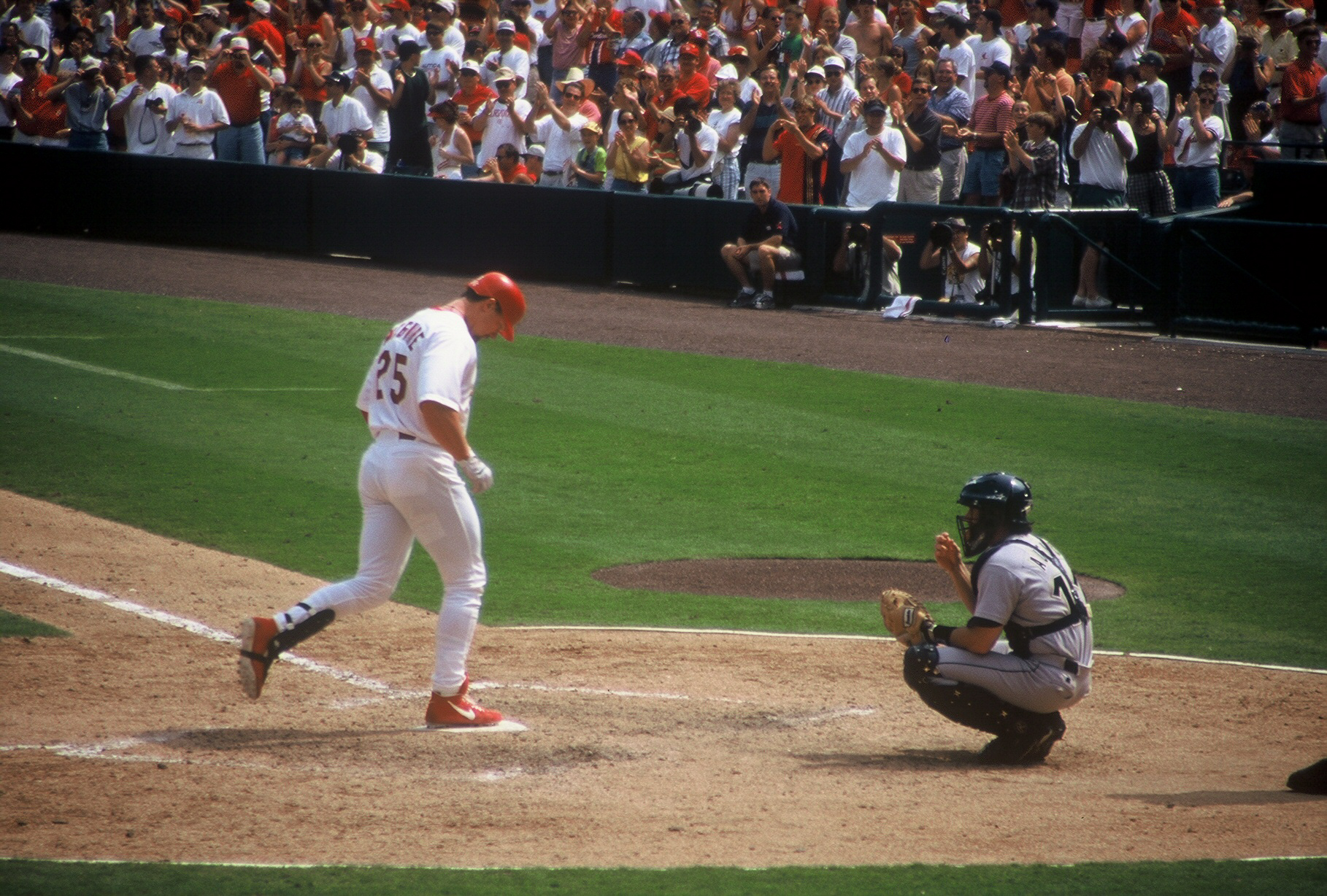
McGwire crossing home plate for a home run in a July 1998 game against the Houston Astros. He hit his 38th–40th home runs of the season in that series.

The three remained competitive entering August, a period which saw McGwire go on a season-high eight-game home run drought. After hitting a home run on August 8, McGwire's lead had dwindled to two, his 46 home runs just above Sosa's 44 and Griffey's 41. His relative lull in production continued, hitting only three home runs over the next ten days. His pace at the end of August 18, 61.9 would be his lowest for the rest of the season. On August 19, he returned to form, hitting two home runs and beginning the stretch that would see him hit 23 home runs in his final 39 games. Sosa, meanwhile, had followed up his 20 home runs in June with a combined total of only 22 for July and August. At the end of the month, however, the two sluggers were locked at 55 home runs, putting them on pace for about 65 in total and, for the first time in 37 years, leaving the single-season home run record in imminent jeopardy. They were also each one short of Hack Wilson's National League record. By this point, Griffey's total of 47 home runs left him well behind the pace of his two rivals, indicating that even in the event he could pass Maris's total, it would be unlikely that he would also be able to beat McGwire and Sosa. Griffey would finish the season with 56 home runs, matching his total from the previous season but still 5 home runs short of Maris' record.

McGwire began September with four home runs in his first two games against the Florida Marlins and took back the lead, 59–56. His September 5 home run set the stage for one of baseball's classic moments, as he sat on 60 home runs entering a two-game set against Sosa's Chicago Cubs. On September 7, McGwire hit a Mike Morgan pitch 430 feet to become the first player since 1961 to hit 61 home runs in a season. The next day, September 8, 1998, in a nationally televised game against Sosa's Cubs and with members of the Maris family in attendance, he hit Steve Trachsel's pitch 341 feet – his shortest home run of the season – just over the left field wall, breaking the record for the most home runs ever hit in a single season. The ball did not even make it to the stands, and was caught by Tim Forneris, who worked as a member of the Busch Stadium grounds crew while attending law school at Saint Louis University. Forneris declined multiple million-dollar offers to sell the ball and instead gave it to McGwire. In what was a show of both admiration as well as respect, Cubs first baseman Mark Grace shared a half-hug high five as McGwire rounded first, and after he touched home, Sosa charged in from right field and engaged McGwire in a celebratory embrace.

Afterwards, however, McGwire went six consecutive games without a home run, allowing Sosa to tie him again at 62 after hitting four home runs in three games against the Milwaukee Brewers. The two battled back and forth for the lead, and entering the final series of the season on September 25, were tied at 65 home runs. Sosa hit a 462-foot home run off Houston Astros pitcher José Lima for his 66th home run of the season and briefly claimed the major league record. McGwire, however, would hit five home runs against five different pitchers during a Cardinals homestand against the Montreal Expos, and would set the single-season MLB home run record at 70 with a 370-foot home run off Carl Pavano.

Throughout the season, Sosa gave a "V" sign after every home run, dedicating it to the memory of Cubs broadcaster Harry Caray, who died that February.

== Aftermath ==
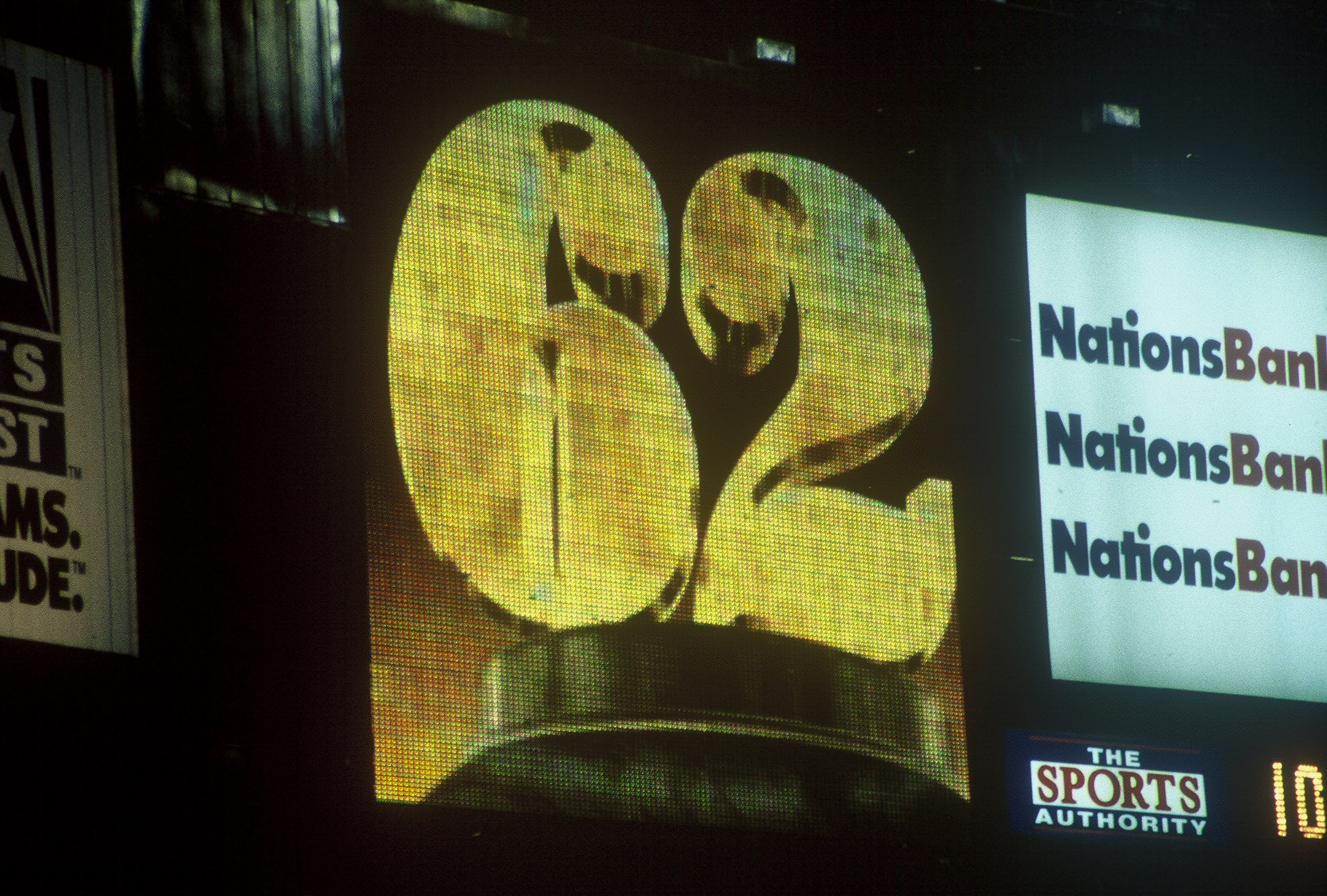
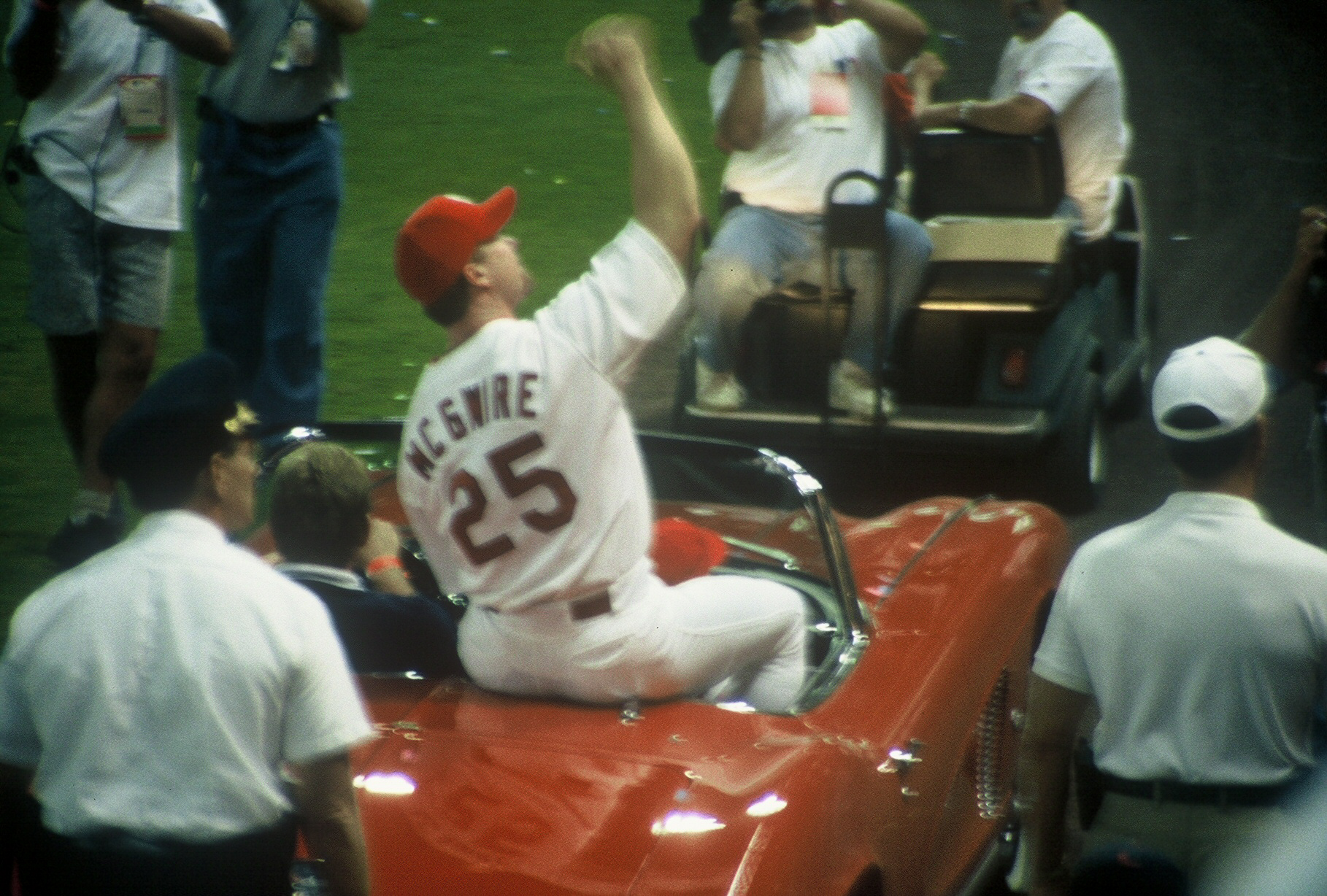
Scenes from the September 8, 1998 game in which McGwire broke Maris's record

The Cardinals, despite McGwire's efforts, finished the season 83–79, third place in the Central and behind division rival Chicago who finished 90–73, earning them second in the Central and a wild card berth. In winning the NL MVP award, Sosa finished with a .308 batting average, 66 home runs, and 158 RBI, besting McGwire, who finished with a .299 batting average, 70 home runs, and 147 RBI. The Cubs, however, were swept in the first round of the 1998 playoffs by the Atlanta Braves.

In 2001, only three years after McGwire and Sosa finally toppled Maris's record, the mark fell again, this time to San Francisco Giants left fielder Barry Bonds. Bonds broke the record on October 5 against Chan Ho Park of the Los Angeles Dodgers and, two days later, hit his 73rd home run of the season off the Dodgers pitcher Dennis Springer. Bonds' record continues to stand today.

The 1997 and 1998 home run record chases are widely credited by sports analysts as having restored interest in MLB among its fan base in the preceding years, as many had lost interest and felt betrayed by the strike in 1994, although others contest this.

The embrace, along with the constant praising of one another between McGwire and Sosa was spoofed in the fall of 1998 on Saturday Night Live by Will Ferrell (as McGwire) and Tracy Morgan (as Sosa) who try to one-up praising each other endlessly and then begin to slow-dance.

=== Steroid controversy ===
The Sosa-McGwire home run chase occurred during the steroid era. Bonds' record still stands, though the controversy over possible use of performance-enhancing drugs by McGwire and Sosa gained momentum when Bonds hit his 73 home runs despite having never hit as many as 50 in any other season. In the Congressional Hearing on Steroids, McGwire stated that any answer he gave regarding his alleged steroid use would not be believed by the public at-large anyway. Sosa seemed to not understand the questions.

Bonds has also been linked to steroids. He admitted to taking them, but he claims that he did not know what he was taking was steroids. Bonds and Sosa have been linked to illegal use of steroids in the Mitchell Report and other sources. McGwire has never been named by any official investigation; however, on January 11, 2010, McGwire admitted to Bob Costas of the MLB Network that he did take steroids throughout his career, including during the 1998 season where he broke the record.

== Home run log ==
The following table outlines home runs that Mark McGwire and Sammy Sosa hit during 1998 season.

Date	Batter	Distance (ft)	Hit Against (Pitcher)	Hit Against (Team)	McGwire Total	Sosa Total
March 31	McGwire	364	Ramón Martínez	Los Angeles Dodgers	1	0
April 2	McGwire	368	Frank Lankford	Los Angeles Dodgers	2	0
April 3	McGwire	364	Mark Langston	San Diego Padres	3	0
April 4	McGwire	419	Don Wengert	San Diego Padres	4	0
April 4	Sosa	371	Marc Valdes	Montreal Expos	4	1
April 11	Sosa	350	Anthony Telford	Montreal Expos	4	2
April 14	McGwire	424	Jeff Suppan	Arizona Diamondbacks	5	2
April 14	McGwire	347	Jeff Suppan	Arizona Diamondbacks	6	2
April 14	McGwire	462	Barry Manuel	Arizona Diamondbacks	7	2
April 15	Sosa	430	Dennis Cook	New York Mets	7	3
April 17	McGwire	419	Matt Whiteside	Philadelphia Phillies	8	3
April 21	McGwire	437	Trey Moore	Montreal Expos	9	3
April 23	Sosa	420	Dan Miceli	San Diego Padres	9	4
April 24	Sosa	430	Ismael Valdez	Los Angeles Dodgers	9	5
April 25	McGwire	419	Jerry Spradlin	Philadelphia Phillies	10	5
April 27	Sosa	434	Joey Hamilton	San Diego Padres	10	6
April 30	McGwire	371	Marc Pisciotta	Chicago Cubs	11	6
May 1	McGwire	362	Rod Beck	Chicago Cubs	12	6
May 3	Sosa	370	Cliff Politte	St. Louis Cardinals	12	7
May 8	McGwire	358	Rick Reed	New York Mets	13	7
May 12	McGwire	527	Paul Wagner	Milwaukee Brewers	14	7
May 14	McGwire	381	Kevin Millwood	Atlanta Braves	15	7
May 16	McGwire	545	Liván Hernández	Florida Marlins	16	7
May 16	Sosa	441	Scott Sullivan	Cincinnati Reds	16	8
May 18	McGwire	478	Jesus Sanchez	Florida Marlins	17	8
May 19	McGwire	440	Tyler Green	Philadelphia Phillies	18	8
May 19	McGwire	471	Tyler Green	Philadelphia Phillies	19	8
May 19	McGwire	451	Wayne Gomes	Philadelphia Phillies	20	8
May 22	McGwire	425	Mark Gardner	San Francisco Giants	21	8
May 22	Sosa	440	Greg Maddux	Atlanta Braves	21	9
May 23	McGwire	366	Rich Rodriguez	San Francisco Giants	22	9
May 23	McGwire	477	John Johnstone	San Francisco Giants	23	9
May 24	McGwire	397	Robb Nen	San Francisco Giants	24	9
May 25	McGwire	433	John Thomson	Colorado Rockies	25	9
May 25	Sosa	410	Kevin Millwood	Atlanta Braves	25	10
May 25	Sosa	420	Mike Cather	Atlanta Braves	25	11
May 27	Sosa	460	Darrin Winston	Philadelphia Phillies	25	12
May 27	Sosa	400	Wayne Gomes	Philadelphia Phillies	25	13
May 29	McGwire	388	Dan Miceli	San Diego Padres	26	13
May 30	McGwire	423	Andy Ashby	San Diego Padres	27	13
June 1	Sosa	430	Ryan Dempster	Florida Marlins	27	14
June 1	Sosa	410	Oscar Henriquez	Florida Marlins	27	15
June 3	Sosa	370	Liván Hernández	Florida Marlins	27	16
June 5	McGwire	409	Orel Hershiser	San Francisco Giants	28	16
June 5	Sosa	370	Jim Parque	Chicago White Sox	28	17
June 6	Sosa	410	Carlos Castillo	Chicago White Sox	28	18
June 7	Sosa	380	James Baldwin	Chicago White Sox	28	19
June 8	McGwire	356	Jason Bere	Chicago White Sox	29	19
June 8	Sosa	340	LaTroy Hawkins	Minnesota Twins	29	20
June 10	McGwire	409	Jim Parque	Chicago White Sox	30	20
June 12	McGwire	438	Andy Benes	Arizona Diamondbacks	31	20
June 13	Sosa	410	Mark Portugal	Philadelphia Phillies	31	21
June 15	Sosa	420	Cal Eldred	Milwaukee Brewers	31	22
June 15	Sosa	410	Cal Eldred	Milwaukee Brewers	31	23
June 15	Sosa	415	Cal Eldred	Milwaukee Brewers	31	24
June 17	McGwire	437	José Lima	Houston Astros	32	24
June 17	Sosa	430	Bronswell Patrick	Milwaukee Brewers	32	25
June 18	McGwire	449	Shane Reynolds	Houston Astros	33	25
June 19	Sosa	380	Carlton Loewer	Philadelphia Phillies	33	26
June 19	Sosa	380	Carlton Loewer	Philadelphia Phillies	33	27
June 20	Sosa	366	Matt Beech	Philadelphia Phillies	33	28
June 20	Sosa	500	Toby Borland	Philadelphia Phillies	33	29
June 21	Sosa	380	Tyler Green	Philadelphia Phillies	33	30
June 24	McGwire	433	Jaret Wright	Cleveland Indians	34	30
June 24	Sosa	390	Seth Greisinger	Detroit Tigers	34	31
June 25	McGwire	461	Dave Burba	Cleveland Indians	35	31
June 25	Sosa	400	Brian Moehler	Detroit Tigers	35	32
June 27	McGwire	431	Mike Trombley	Minnesota Twins	36	32
June 30	McGwire	472	Glendon Rusch	Kansas City Royals	37	32
June 30	Sosa	364	Alan Embree	Arizona Diamondbacks	37	33
July 9	Sosa	432	Jeff Juden	Milwaukee Brewers	37	34
July 10	Sosa	428	Scott Karl	Milwaukee Brewers	37	35
July 11	McGwire	485	Billy Wagner	Houston Astros	38	35
July 12	McGwire	405	Sean Bergman	Houston Astros	39	35
July 12	McGwire	415	Scott Elarton	Houston Astros	40	35
July 17	McGwire	511	Brian Bohanon	Los Angeles Dodgers	41	35
July 17	McGwire	425	Antonio Osuna	Los Angeles Dodgers	42	35
July 17	Sosa	440	Kirt Ojala	Florida Marlins	42	36
July 20	McGwire	452	Brian Boehringer	San Diego Padres	43	36
July 22	Sosa	365	Miguel Batista	Montreal Expos	43	37
July 26	McGwire	452	John Thomson	Colorado Rockies	44	37
July 26	Sosa	420	Rick Reed	New York Mets	44	38
July 27	Sosa	347	Willie Blair	Arizona Diamondbacks	44	39
July 27	Sosa	438	Alan Embree	Arizona Diamondbacks	44	40
July 28	McGwire	408	Mike Myers	Milwaukee Brewers	45	40
July 28	Sosa	390	Bob Wolcott	Arizona Diamondbacks	45	41
July 31	Sosa	375	Jamey Wright	Colorado Rockies	45	42
August 5	Sosa	374	Andy Benes	Arizona Diamondbacks	45	43
August 8	McGwire	374	Mark Clark	Chicago Cubs	46	43
August 8	Sosa	400	Rich Croushore	St. Louis Cardinals	46	44
August 10	Sosa	361	Russ Ortiz	San Francisco Giants	46	45
August 10	Sosa	480	Chris Brock	San Francisco Giants	46	46
August 11	McGwire	464	Bobby Jones	New York Mets	47	46
August 16	Sosa	360	Sean Bergman	Houston Astros	47	47
August 19	Sosa	368	Kent Bottenfield	St. Louis Cardinals	47	48
August 19	McGwire	398	Matt Karchner	Chicago Cubs	48	48
August 19	McGwire	409	Terry Mulholland	Chicago Cubs	49	48
August 20	McGwire	369	Willie Blair	New York Mets	50	48
August 20	McGwire	393	Rick Reed	New York Mets	51	48
August 21	Sosa	430	Orel Hershiser	San Francisco Giants	51	49
August 22	McGwire	477	Francisco Córdova	Pittsburgh Pirates	52	49
August 23	McGwire	393	Ricardo Rincón	Pittsburgh Pirates	53	49
August 23	Sosa	440	José Lima	Houston Astros	53	50
August 23	Sosa	380	José Lima	Houston Astros	53	51
August 26	McGwire	509	Justin Speier	Florida Marlins	54	51
August 26	Sosa	438	Brett Tomko	Cincinnati Reds	54	52
August 28	Sosa	414	John Thomson	Colorado Rockies	54	53
August 30	McGwire	501	Dennis Martínez	Atlanta Braves	55	53
August 30	Sosa	482	Darryl Kile	Colorado Rockies	55	54
August 31	Sosa	364	Brett Tomko	Cincinnati Reds	55	55
September 1	McGwire	450	Liván Hernández	Florida Marlins	56	55
September 1	McGwire	472	Donn Pall	Florida Marlins	57	55
September 2	McGwire	497	Brian Edmondson	Florida Marlins	58	55
September 2	McGwire	458	Rob Stanifer	Florida Marlins	59	55
September 2	Sosa	363	Jason Bere	Cincinnati Reds	59	56
September 4	Sosa	374	Jason Schmidt	Pittsburgh Pirates	59	57
September 5	McGwire	381	Dennys Reyes	Cincinnati Reds	60	57
September 5	Sosa	417	Sean Lawrence	Pittsburgh Pirates	60	58
September 7	McGwire	430	Mike Morgan	Chicago Cubs	**61**†	58
September 8	McGwire	341	Steve Trachsel	Chicago Cubs	**62**	58
September 11	Sosa	464	Bill Pulsipher	Milwaukee Brewers	62	59
September 12	Sosa	430	Valerio de los Santos	Milwaukee Brewers	62	60
September 13	Sosa	480	Bronswell Patrick	Milwaukee Brewers	62	61
September 13	Sosa	480	Eric Plunk	Milwaukee Brewers	62	**62**†
September 15	McGwire	385	Jason Christiansen	Pittsburgh Pirates	**63**	62
September 16	Sosa	434	Brian Boehringer	San Diego Padres	63	**63**†
September 18	McGwire	423	Rafael Roque	Milwaukee Brewers	**64**	63
September 20	McGwire	423	Scott Karl	Milwaukee Brewers	**65**	63
September 23	Sosa	344	Rafael Roque	Milwaukee Brewers	65	64
September 23	Sosa	410	Rod Henderson	Milwaukee Brewers	65	**65**†
September 25	Sosa	462	José Lima	Houston Astros	65	**66**
September 25	McGwire	375	Shayne Bennett	Montreal Expos	**66**†	66
September 26	McGwire	403	Dustin Hermanson	Montreal Expos	**67**	66
September 26	McGwire	435	Kirk Bullinger	Montreal Expos	**68**	66
September 27	McGwire	377	Mike Thurman	Montreal Expos	**69**	66
September 27	McGwire	370	Carl Pavano	Montreal Expos	**70**	66

- Major League Baseball single-season home run record indicated in **bold**.
- Home runs that tied the existing record indicated by †.
