= Bronswell Patrick =

American baseball player (born 1970)

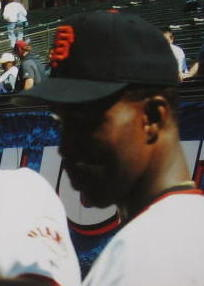
- Patrick with the Giants
- Pitcher
- Born: September 16, 1970 (age 55); Greenville, North Carolina, U.S.
- Batted: Right Threw: Right

MLB debut
- May 18, 1998, for the Milwaukee Brewers

Last MLB appearance
- October 3, 1999, for the San Francisco Giants

MLB statistics
- Win–loss record: 5–1
- Earned run average: 5.04
- Strikeouts: 55

KBO statistics
- Win–loss record: 5–7
- Earned run average: 5.96
- Strikeouts: 45
- Stats at Baseball Reference

Teams
- Milwaukee Brewers (1998); San Francisco Giants (1999); Samsung Lions (2002)

Bronswell Dante Patrick (born September 16, 1970) is an American former professional baseball relief pitcher. He played in parts of two seasons in Major League Baseball (MLB) and appeared in several international leagues. After his playing career, he became a pitching coach and manager. He has coached Athletics pitchers since 2023.

== Playing career ==
Patrick attended D. H. Conley High School in Greenville, North Carolina, where he played baseball, basketball and football. He had scholarship offers to play both football and baseball at NC State University but chose instead to sign with the Oakland Athletics after they selected him in the 23rd round of the 1988 MLB draft with the 593rd overall pick. Patrick started out with the Phoenix Athletics in the Arizona League and pitched in Oakland's system until 1995, when he left as a minor league free agent.

Patrick had agreed to play as a replacement player during the 1994–95 baseball strike, but his MLB debut was postponed when the strike ended. Until his major league debut in 1998, he spent ten years languishing in the Oakland, Houston, and Milwaukee farm systems. Upon signing with the Brewers before the 1998 season, he told his wife that we would retire if he did not make the Majors that year.

On May 11, 1998, the Brewers placed Chad Fox on the disabled list and promoted Patrick from Triple-A Louisville. On May 18, 1998, he made his major league debut as a reliever for the Brewers. He spent much of that season with the Brewers, pitching 78 1/3 innings while appearing mostly in relief. He collected four wins and one loss, struck out 49 batters, and posted a 4.69 earned run average. In a game on August 1, he hit a home run against Félix Rodríguez, becoming the first Brewers pitcher to hit a home run since Skip Lockwood in 1971. In a September 13 game against the Chicago Cubs, Patrick surrendered a home run to Sammy Sosa, during Sosa's chase of the record for the single-season home run record. The home run in question was Sosa's 61st of the season, tying the previous mark set by Yankees outfielder Roger Maris, and placing him one behind McGwire, who had hit his 62nd on September 8. Later in the same game, Sosa would hit his 62nd against Eric Plunk to pull into a tie with McGwire.

After the season, the Brewers removed Patrick from their roster, and he joined the San Francisco Giants organization. Working as a starter for their AAA affiliate, the Fresno Grizzlies, Patrick set a Fresno record with 14 wins. The Giants rewarded him for his good work with a September callup, and he appeared in six games for them, picking up a win and a save despite a 10.12 ERA. His one save came on September 29, 1999, against the arch rival Dodgers. Patrick retired the final two batters of the game to preserve a 5-1 Giants victory. Patrick nailed down the win for starting pitcher Liván Hernández.

The Giants removed him from their roster after the season, but Patrick continued to pitch professionally. In 2002, he pitched in the Korea Baseball Organization for the Samsung Lions. He was one of the top pitchers in the Mexican League in 2003, with his 13–2 record helping the Diablos Rojos del Mexico win their 14th championship. Most recently, he spent part of 2005 with the Olmecas de Tabasco and Leones de Yucatán of that same league, then joined the Brother Elephants of the Chinese Professional Baseball League. In a 2000 interview with the Calgary Sun, Patrick was quoted as saying, "I'm going to continue to try and pitch as long as I can. Until they come and tell me they're taking the uniform away, and even then they're not getting it without a fight."

In between, Patrick played winter ball with the Leones del Caracas and Tiburones de La Guaira clubs of the Venezuelan Professional Baseball League in three seasons spanning 1997–2005.

== Coaching career ==
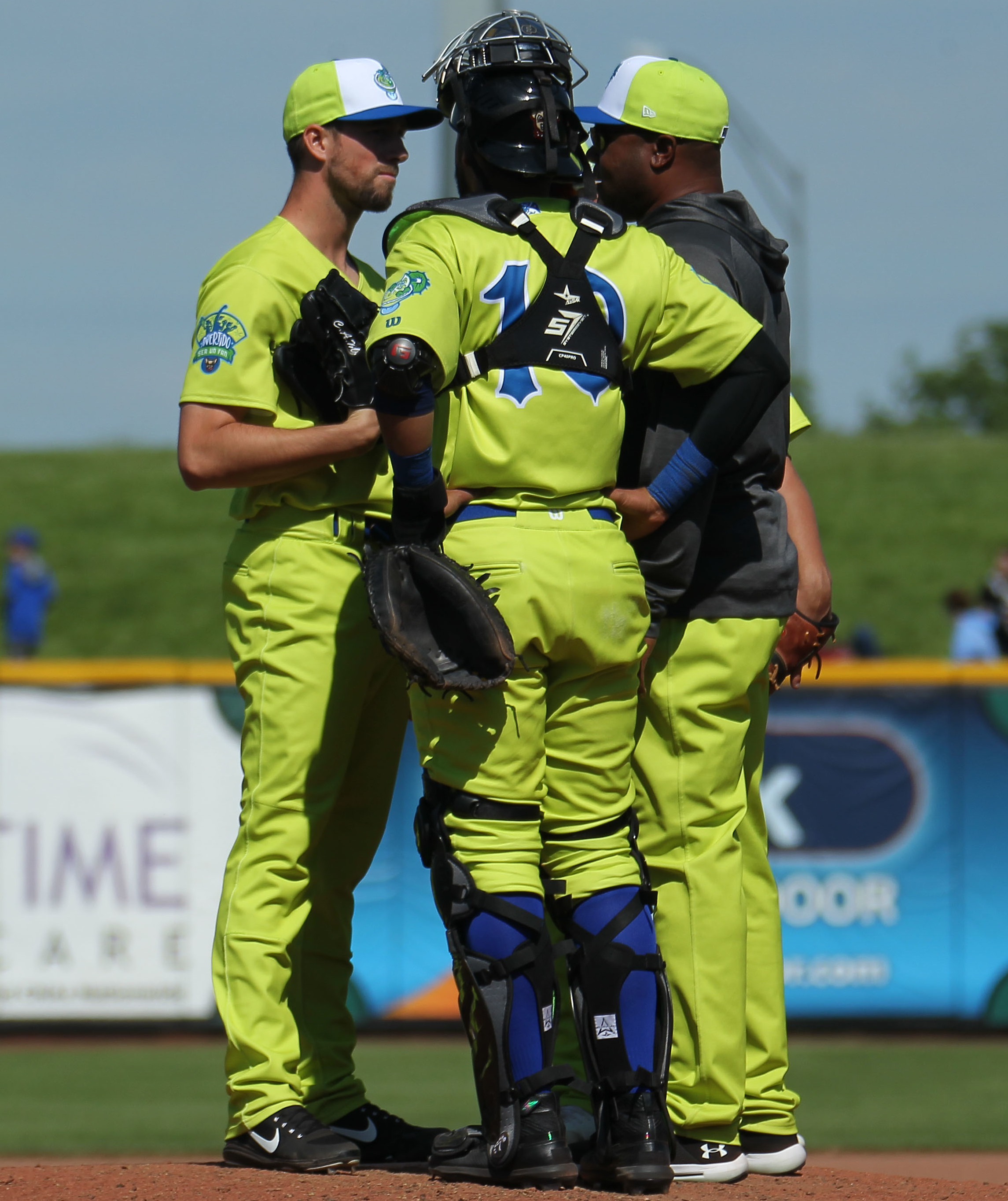
Patrick (right) holding a mound visit as the pitching coach of the El Paso Chihuahuas in 2019

In 2008, Patrick joined the staff of the Arizona League Padres as the team's pitching coach. He also worked in the same capacity for the Single-A Fort Wayne TinCaps of the Midwest League in the 2010 season.

Before the 2013 season, he was named pitching coach of the Tucson Padres.

In 2015, he was hired as the pitching coach of the El Paso Chihuahuas. In 2016, he was named the pitching coach for the Pacific Coast League in the Triple-A All-Star Game.

Patrick has coached for the Naranjeros de Hermosillo of the Mexican Pacific League, and was promoted to manager of the club for the 2018–19 season. In 2020, he became the Águilas de Mexicali manager.

In February 2022, Patrick joined Diablos Rojos del México of the Mexican League as pitching coach. However, he left the team prior to the start of the season, for what the club cited was for personal reasons. Patrick later joined the Acereros de Monclova of the Mexican League on May 2, 2022, as their new pitching coach.

Patrick joined the Athletics organization in 2023, first as the pitching coach for the ACL Athletics of the Arizona Complex League. In 2024, he became the pitching coach of the Triple-A Las Vegas Aces. The following year, he was name a roving pitching development coach.

== Personal life ==
Patrick married his wife, Julie, in the late 1990s while he was still a minor leaguer. Shortly after getting married, they had a son named Tavian. Tavian walked on to play college football at Arizona State.

According to Patrick, his unusual given name was suggested by an aunt, who claimed to have seen it used overseas. He has two sons Tavain, Kilian, and one daughter Jayden.
