= List of Major League Baseball progressive single-season home run leaders =

The Major League Baseball single-season record for the number of home runs hit by a batter has changed many times over the years.

== Single-season records ==
Batter	Team	Age	Year	HR	Reign	Record breaker
George Hall	Philadelphia Athletics	27	1876	5	3 years	—
Charley Jones	Boston Red Caps	29	1879	9	4 years	6th on July 31 off George Bradley
Harry Stovey	Philadelphia Athletics	27	1883	14	1 year	10th on August 1 off Jack Neagle
Ned Williamson	Chicago White Stockings	27	1884	27	35 years	15th on July 9 off Ed Bagley
Babe Ruth	Boston Red Sox	24	1919	29	1 year	28th on September 24 off Bob Shawkey
Babe Ruth	New York Yankees	25	1920	54	1 year	30th on July 19 off Dickie Kerr
Babe Ruth	New York Yankees	26	1921	59	6 years	55th on September 15 off Bill Bayne
Babe Ruth	New York Yankees	32	1927	60	34 years	60th on September 30 off Tom Zachary
Roger Maris	New York Yankees	27	1961	61	37 years	61st on October 1 off Tracy Stallard
Mark McGwire	St. Louis Cardinals	35	1998	65	5 days	62nd on September 8 off Steve Trachsel
Sammy Sosa	Chicago Cubs	30	1998	66	43 minutes	66th on September 25 off Jose Lima
Mark McGwire	St. Louis Cardinals	35	1998	70	3 years	67th on September 26 off Rod Henderson
Barry Bonds	San Francisco Giants	36	2001	73	25 years	71st on October 5 off Chan Ho Park

== Progression ==
Summarized from The Baseball Encyclopedia for older information, and from various news stories for newer information:

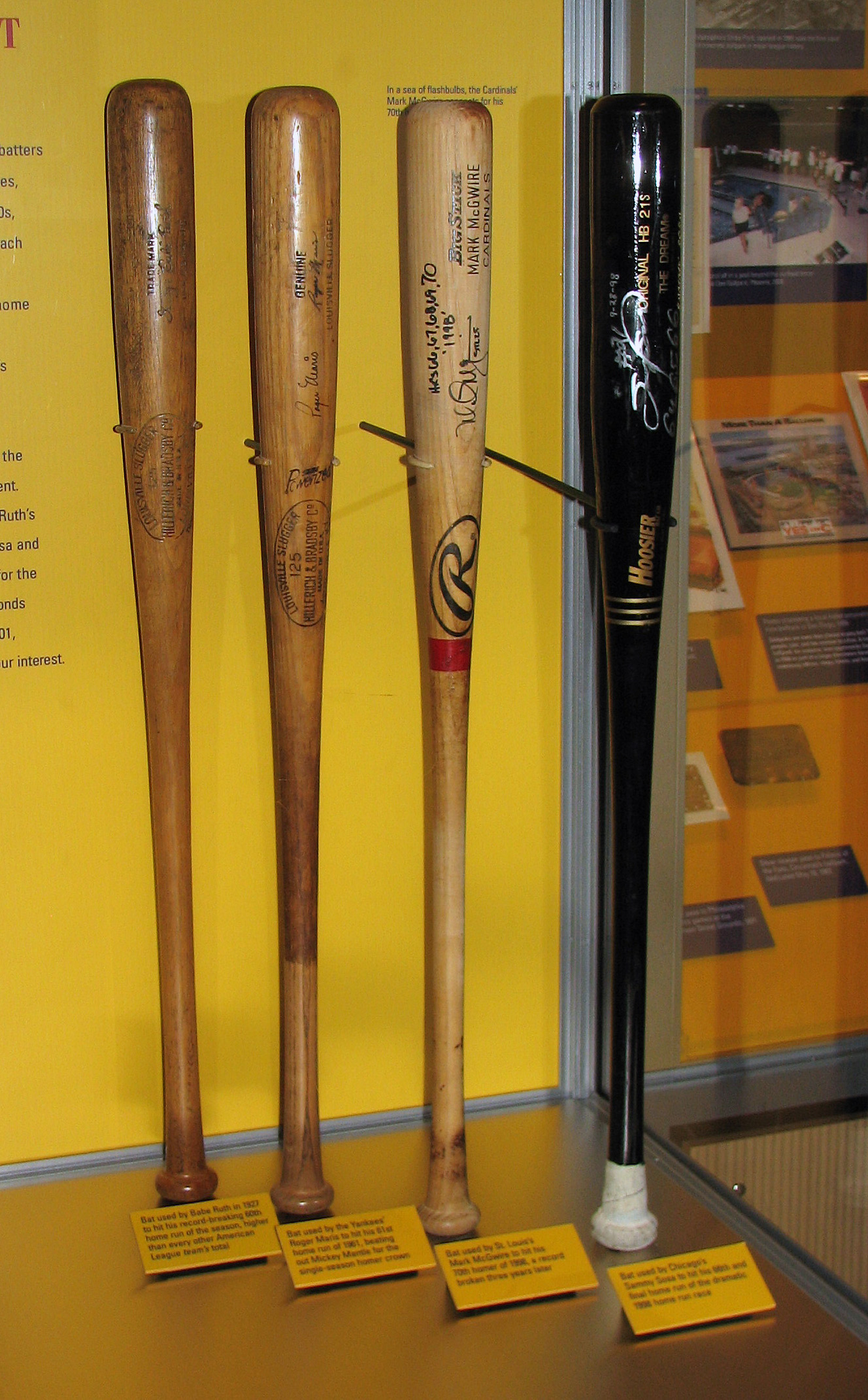
Four baseball bats that were used in setting single-season home run records. From left to right: bat used by Babe Ruth to hit his 60th home run during the 1927 season, bat used by Roger Maris to hit his 61st home run during the 1961 season, bat used by Mark McGwire to hit his 70th home run during the 1998 season, and the bat used by Sammy Sosa for his 66th home run during the same season.

5, by George Hall, Philadelphia Athletics (NL), 1876 (70-game schedule)

9, by Charley Jones, Boston Red Stockings (NL), 1879 (84-game schedule)

14, by Harry Stovey, Philadelphia Athletics (AA), 1883 (98-game schedule)

27, by Ned Williamson, Chicago White Stockings (NL), 1884 (113-game schedule, includes one tie game)

Williamson benefited from a very short outfield fence in his home ballpark, Lakeshore Park. During the park's previous years, balls hit over the fence in that park were ground-rule doubles, but in 1884 (its final year) they were credited as home runs. Williamson led the pace, but several of his Chicago teammates also topped the 20 HR mark that season. Of Williamson's total, 25 were hit at home, and only 2 on the road. Noticing the fluke involved, fans of the early 20th century were more impressed with Buck Freeman's total of 25 home runs in 1899 or Gavvy Cravath's 1915 total of 24.

29, by Babe Ruth, Boston Red Sox (AL), 1919 (140-game schedule, team only played 138)

Even with that relatively small quantity, and still pitching part-time, Ruth alone hit more home runs than did 10 of the 15 other major league clubs. The second-highest individual total was 12, by Gavvy Cravath of the Philadelphia Phillies. Ruth homered in every park in the league, the first time anyone had achieved that distinction. Ruth was a pitcher by trade, and the ultimate exception to the axiom that pitchers can't hit. Ruth had led the league with 11 in 1918, despite playing only 95 games, and still in the "dead-ball" era. By 1919, after the War, the materials for baseballs began to improve and became naturally "livelier".

54, by Ruth, New York Yankees (AL), 1920 (154-game schedule)

Ruth hit just a few more home runs on the road (26) than he had the previous year (20), but he hit far more (29) in the Polo Grounds in New York (where the Yankees played at the time) than he had in Fenway Park (9) in Boston the year before, as he took full advantage of the nearby right field wall, although he also hit many long drives at the Polo Grounds. Of the other 15 major league clubs, only the Philadelphia Phillies exceeded Ruth's single-handed total, hitting 64 in their bandbox ballpark Baker Bowl. The second-highest individual total was the St. Louis Browns' George Sisler's 19. Ruth's major-league record slugging percentage (total bases / at bats) of .847 stood for the next 80 years.

59, by Ruth, New York (AL), 1921 (154-game schedule)

Ruth's slugging percentage was just .001 less than his record-setting average the previous year.

60, by Ruth, New York (AL), 1927 (155-game schedule, includes one tie game)

Ruth hit more home runs in 1927 than any of the other seven American League teams. His closest rival was his teammate Lou Gehrig, who hit 47 homers that year.

61, by Roger Maris, New York (AL), 1961 (163-game schedule, includes one tie game))

Pushing Maris that year was teammate Mickey Mantle; slowed by an injury late in the season, Mantle finished with 54. This was the first year of expansion in the AL, with two added, and the season extended from 154 to 162 games.

70, by Mark McGwire, St. Louis Cardinals (NL), 1998 (163-game schedule, includes one tie game))

After an epic battle between McGwire and Ken Griffey Jr., who both got into the 50s in 1997, many expected the two to take on Maris in 1998. However, the player that competed for the record with McGwire in 1998 was Sammy Sosa of the Chicago Cubs, who propelled himself into the race with a record-setting 20 home runs that June. He would finish with 66 that season and actually led McGwire for approximately 45 minutes after hitting his 66th, until McGwire hit his own 66th, and four more in his final three games of the season. McGwire broke the old records in 144 games – fewer than even the old 154-game season. That removed season-length as a source of "asterisk" controversy, but McGwire's connection to the steroid scandal introduced a new call for asterisks on this and other records set in this era. On January 11, 2010, McGwire admitted using steroids during the 1998 season. McGwire claimed to use steroids to help heal an ailing body and denied they helped him to hit a baseball.

73, by Barry Bonds, San Francisco Giants (NL), 2001 (162-game schedule)

In part due to 9/11 terrorist attacks, the then-recently set record of only three years prior by McGwire, and Bonds' poor relationship with the media and some fans, Bonds' record-setting was perhaps not as publicized as the previous chases. Bonds was initially chased closely by Sosa and Luis Gonzalez of the Arizona Diamondbacks, but Gonzalez faded late and finished with 57, while Sosa finished closer with 64 to become the first player to exceed 60 home runs in three separate seasons. McGwire was not a factor during what would be his final major league season, as the injuries that had plagued him for much of his career finally took their toll, although he still hit at a pace that would have put him near 50 if he had played a full season. Bonds' slugging percentage of .863 broke the major league record set by Ruth in 1920. As happened with McGwire's record, Bonds' connection to steroids resulted in his accomplishments being questioned in the era.

== Home runs per game ==
Number of home runs in the season divided by number of games in schedule (not games played)

Average	Name	Season	HR	Games in schedule
0.451	Barry Bonds	2001	73	162
0.429	Mark McGwire	1998	70	163
0.387	Babe Ruth (1)	1927	60	155
0.383	Babe Ruth (2)	1921	59	154
0.374	Roger Maris	1961	61	163
0.351	Babe Ruth (3)	1920	54	154
0.239	Ned Williamson	1884	27	113
0.210	Babe Ruth (4)	1919	29	138
0.143	Harry Stovey	1883	14	98
0.107	Charley Jones	1879	9	84
0.071	George Hall	1876	5	70

== See also ==
- The Year Babe Ruth Hit 104 Home Runs
