= Gabe González =

American baseball player (born 1972)

- Pitcher
- Born: May 24, 1972 (age 54); Long Beach, California, U.S.
- Batted: Left Threw: Left

MLB debut
- April 1, 1998, for the Florida Marlins

Last MLB appearance
- April 4, 1998, for the Florida Marlins

MLB statistics
- Win–loss record: 0–0
- Earned run average: 9.00
- Strikeouts: 0
- Stats at Baseball Reference

Teams
- Florida Marlins (1998)

Gabriel González (born May 24, 1972) is an American former Major League Baseball pitcher who played for one season. He pitched for the Florida Marlins for three games during the 1998 Florida Marlins season.
