= John Roskos =

American baseball player (born 1974)

- First baseman/Catcher/Outfielder
- Born: November 19, 1974 (age 51); Victorville, California, U.S.
- Batted: Right Threw: Right

MLB debut
- April 20, 1998, for the Florida Marlins

Last MLB appearance
- May 14, 2000, for the San Diego Padres

MLB statistics
- Batting average: .082
- Hits: 4
- At-bats: 49
- Stats at Baseball Reference

Teams
- Florida Marlins (1998–1999); San Diego Padres (2000)

John Edward Roskos (born November 19, 1974) is an American former Major League Baseball player who played for three seasons. He played for the Florida Marlins from 1998 to 1999 and the San Diego Padres in 2000. Over his major league career, he played six games as an outfielder, three as a first baseman, and one as a catcher. Over his professional career, he played 266 games as a first baseman, 206 as a catcher, and 151 as an outfielder. Currently he is employed by the Rio Rancho Police Department in New Mexico as a Police officer.
