= Joe Fontenot =

American baseball player (born 1977)

- Pitcher
- Born: March 20, 1977 (age 48); Scott, Louisiana, U.S.
- Batted: Right Threw: Right

MLB debut
- May 23, 1998, for the Florida Marlins

Last MLB appearance
- July 2, 1998, for the Florida Marlins

MLB statistics
- Win–loss record: 0–7
- Earned run average: 6.33
- Strikeouts: 24
- Stats at Baseball Reference

Teams
- Florida Marlins (1998)

Joseph Daniel Fontenot (born March 20, 1977) is an American former Major League Baseball player. Fontenot pitched in eight games for the Florida Marlins in the 1998 season.

Fontenot was selected by the San Francisco Giants in the first round of the 1995 Major League Baseball draft but traded to the Marlins in 1997 as part of a deal for closer Robb Nen. He said the transaction made him "feel a little betrayed" by the Giants who were "like [his] parents." In his first spring training in the Marlins organization, he was told he would spend the year in the minors. However, that May, he was promoted directly to the Major Leagues from Double-A, a promotion which he later said was "too quick." Fontenot struggled in his time with the Marlins, losing all seven of his decisions with a 6.33 earned run average. After eight games started, he injured his shoulder and did not return to the majors. The following year, he said it was both a "horrible experience" and "the best thing to happen to" him because it "prepared [him] for where [he was] going." He did not pitch in the majors again.
