= Keith Glauber =

American baseball player (born 1972)

- Pitcher
- Born: January 18, 1972 (age 54); Brooklyn, New York, U.S.
- Batted: Right Threw: Right

MLB debut
- September 8, 1998, for the Cincinnati Reds

Last MLB appearance
- September 24, 2000, for the Cincinnati Reds

MLB statistics
- Win–loss record: 0–0
- Earned run average: 3.00
- Strikeouts: 8
- Stats at Baseball Reference

Teams
- Cincinnati Reds (1998, 2000)

Keith Harris Glauber (born January 18, 1972) is an American former professional baseball pitcher. He played in Major League Baseball (MLB) for the Cincinnati Reds in 1998 and 2000.

== Career ==
Glauber was born in Brooklyn, New York, and is Jewish. He attended Marlboro High School in Marlboro, New Jersey, Coastal Carolina University in Conway, South Carolina, and Montclair State University in Montclair, New Jersey.

Glauber was drafted by the St. Louis Cardinals in the 42nd round, with the 1,169th overall selection, of the 1994 Major League Baseball draft. He played parts of two seasons in MLB for the Cincinnati Reds in 1998 and 2000.
