= Mark Smith (outfielder) =

American baseball player (born 1970)

- Outfielder
- Born: May 7, 1970 (age 54); Pasadena, California, U.S.
- Batted: Right Threw: Right

Professional debut
- MLB: May 14, 1994, for the Baltimore Orioles
- NPB: April 2, 1999, for the Yakult Swallows
- KBO: April 2, 2005, for the Hanwha Eagles

Last appearance
- NPB: October 16, 1999, for the Yakult Swallows
- MLB: September 28, 2003, for the Milwaukee Brewers
- KBO: May 18, 2005, for the Hanwha Eagles

MLB statistics
- Batting average: .243
- Home runs: 32
- Runs batted in: 138

NPB statistics
- Batting average: .324
- Home runs: 20
- Runs batted in: 55

KBO statistics
- Batting average: .220
- Home runs: 6
- Runs batted in: 19
- Stats at Baseball Reference

Teams
- Baltimore Orioles (1994–1996); Pittsburgh Pirates (1997–1998); Yakult Swallows (1999); Florida Marlins (2000); Montreal Expos (2001); Milwaukee Brewers (2003); Hanwha Eagles (2005)

Mark Edward Smith (born May 7, 1970) is an American former professional baseball outfielder. He played in Major League Baseball (MLB) for the Baltimore Orioles, Pittsburgh Pirates, Florida Marlins, Montreal Expos, and Milwaukee Brewers. Smith also played for the Yakult Swallows of Nippon Professional Baseball (NPB), and the Hanwha Eagles of the KBO League.

== College career ==
Mark Smith played college baseball at the University of Southern California. In 1990, Smith played collegiate summer baseball for the Wareham Gatemen of the Cape Cod Baseball League (CCBL). He batted .408 and led the Gatemen to the league title. Smith was named league MVP and was inducted into the CCBL Hall of Fame in 2011.

== Professional career ==
Mark Smith began his professional career with the Frederick Keys in 1991. His best minor league season was in 1992 with the Class AA Hagerstown Suns, where he was selected as an outfielder for the Eastern League End of Season All Star Team,

Smith played Major League Baseball between 1994 and 2003 for the Baltimore Orioles, Pittsburgh Pirates, Florida Marlins, Montreal Expos and Milwaukee Brewers. In 1999, he played in Japan for the Yakult Swallows. In 2005, he played in South Korea for the Hanwha Eagles, but was released on the regular season.

What may be regarded as the most noteworthy of Smith's accomplishments on the baseball diamond occurred on July 12, 1997. Smith hit a 3-run home run off of John Hudek in the bottom of the 10th inning in a scoreless game to give the Pittsburgh Pirates a 3–0 win over the Houston Astros. The home run also ended the first extra-innings combined no-hitter in MLB history. Francisco Córdova no-hit the Astros in the first 9 innings, while reliever Ricardo Rincón pitched a hitless 10th inning for the Pirates.

== Award for heroism ==
In 2001, Smith received the Steve Palermo Award for heroism from the Baseball Assistance Team (B.A.T.) for his actions in July 2000, when he rescued a man whose car had crashed and was on fire.
