= Javier Martínez (baseball) =

Puerto Rican baseball player (born 1977)

- Pitcher
- Born: February 5, 1977 (age 48); Bayamón, Puerto Rico
- Batted: Right Threw: Right

MLB debut
- April 2, 1998, for the Pittsburgh Pirates

Last MLB appearance
- September 27, 1998, for the Pittsburgh Pirates

MLB statistics
- Win–loss record: 0–1
- Earned run average: 4.38
- Strikeouts: 42
- Stats at Baseball Reference

Teams
- Pittsburgh Pirates (1998)

Javier Antonio Martínez (born February 5, 1977) is a Puerto Rican former professional baseball pitcher who played one season in Major League Baseball (MLB) with the Pittsburgh Pirates in 1998.

== Career ==
Martínez was selected by the Chicago Cubs in the third round of the 1994 Major League Baseball draft. He began his professional career that same year with the Gulf Coast Cubs in the Rookie League, and later advanced through the Cubs’ minor league system, playing for teams including the Rockford Cubbies, Daytona Cubs, and Dayton Dragons.

In 1998, Martínez was traded to the Pittsburgh Pirates and made his MLB debut on April 2, appearing in 29 games during the season. He posted a 0–1 record with a 4.38 earned run average and recorded 42 strikeouts across 49.1 innings pitched.

After his stint in the majors, Martínez continued to play professionally in the minor and independent leagues until 2004. His later career included time with organizations such as the Baltimore Orioles and Montreal Expos systems, pitching for affiliates like the Bowie Baysox, Ottawa Lynx, and Jackson Senators.

== See also ==
- List of Major League Baseball players from Puerto Rico
