= Chance Sanford =

American baseball player (born 1972)

- Infielder
- Born: June 2, 1972 (age 52); Houston, Texas, U.S.
- Batted: Left Threw: Right

MLB debut
- April 30, 1998, for the Pittsburgh Pirates

Last MLB appearance
- June 9, 1999, for the Los Angeles Dodgers

MLB statistics
- Batting average: .167
- Home runs: 0
- Runs batted in: 5
- Stats at Baseball Reference

Teams
- Pittsburgh Pirates (1998); Los Angeles Dodgers (1999)

Chance Steven Sanford (born June 2, 1972) is an American former professional baseball infielder who played in Major League Baseball (MLB) for the Pittsburgh Pirates and Los Angeles Dodgers.

== Career ==
Drafted by the Pittsburgh Pirates in the 27th round of the 1992 Major League Baseball draft, Sanford made his Major League Baseball (MLB) debut with the Pittsburgh Pirates on April 30, 1998, and appeared in his final MLB game on June 9, 1999.
