= Eddie Priest =

American baseball player (born 1974)

- Pitcher
- Born: April 8, 1974 (age 51); Boaz, Alabama
- Batted: Right Threw: Left

MLB debut
- May 27, 1998, for the Cincinnati Reds

Last MLB appearance
- June 1, 1998, for the Cincinnati Reds

MLB statistics
- Win–loss record: 0–1
- Earned run average: 10.50
- Strikeouts: 1
- Stats at Baseball Reference

Teams
- Cincinnati Reds (1998)

Eddie Lee Priest (born April 8, 1974) is a former Major League Baseball pitcher.

Priest went to Susan Moore High School in Blountsville, Alabama. The Cincinnati Reds drafted Priest in the ninth round of the 1994 Major League Baseball draft. He played for the Cincinnati Reds in 1998, appearing in two games: May 27 and June 1.

On June 16, 1998, the Reds traded Priest with Christian Rojas to the Cleveland Indians for Rick Krivda. The Reds selected Priest off waivers after the season.
