= Ryan Jackson (first baseman/outfielder) =

American baseball player (born 1971)

- First baseman / Outfielder
- Born: November 15, 1971 (age 54); Orlando, Florida, U.S.
- Batted: Left Threw: Left

Professional debut
- MLB: March 31, 1998, for the Florida Marlins
- KBO: May 11, 2004, for the Lotte Giants

Last appearance
- MLB: June 18, 2002, for the Detroit Tigers
- KBO: September 27, 2005, for the Lotte Giants

MLB statistics
- Batting average: .239
- Home runs: 7
- Runs batted in: 52

KBO statistics
- Batting average: .282
- Home runs: 23
- Runs batted in: 128
- Stats at Baseball Reference

Teams
- Florida Marlins (1998); Seattle Mariners (1999); Detroit Tigers (2001–2002); Lotte Giants (2004–2005)

Ryan Dewitte Jackson (born November 15, 1971) is an American professional baseball coach and a former Major League Baseball first baseman and outfielder who played for the Florida Marlins, Seattle Mariners, and Detroit Tigers between 1998 and 2002. He also played for the Lotte Giants of the Korea Baseball Organization in 2004 and 2005.

Jackson became a minor league coach following his playing career. He is currently the mental performance coordinator for the Pittsburgh Pirates.

== Playing career ==
Born in Orlando, Florida, Jackson graduated from Cardinal Mooney High School in Sarasota, Florida, and attended Duke University. In 1991, he played collegiate summer baseball with the Harwich Mariners of the Cape Cod Baseball League. He holds Duke's all-time single-season home run record with 22 in 1994, and his 42 home runs are one fewer than Nate Freiman career record at Duke, as of 2025.

The Florida Marlins drafted Jackson in the seventh round of the 1994 Major League Baseball draft. He made his major league debut on March 3, 1998, for the Marlins against the Chicago Cubs. He set career-highs in games played, at-bats, home runs, and RBI that year. On April 9, 1999, he was claimed off waivers by the Seattle Mariners. Released after the 1999 season, he signed with the Tampa Bay Devil Rays and spent the entire year with Triple-A Durham. After the 2000 season, Jackson signed with the Detroit Tigers with whom he played for the next two seasons.

On November 6, 2002, Jackson signed with the Devil Rays and spent the whole year in the minors. In 2004, he played 16 games for the Atlanta Braves' Triple-A affiliate, the Richmond Braves. He then played for the Lotte Giants in the Korea Baseball Organization in 2004 and 2005.

== Coaching career ==
Jackson began his coaching career at the minor league level in the Cincinnati Reds' organization. In 2007, Jackson became the hitting coach for the Single-A Sarasota Reds, and again served as the hitting coach in 2008. He was named the hitting coach for Double-A Carolina for the 2009 and 2010 seasons, then he assumed the same position for the Triple-A Louisville Bats beginning with the 2011 season, under new manager David Bell. He then served as the Reds' roving minor league hitting coordinator from 2012 through 2016.

In January 2019, he was named field coordinator for the Boston Red Sox' player development system. He became a special assistant in player development in 2023.

In 2025, Jackson was a minor league mental performance coordinator with the Pittsburgh Pirates. He became a Pirates' major league coach in 2026.
