= Rick Krivda =

American baseball player (born 1970)

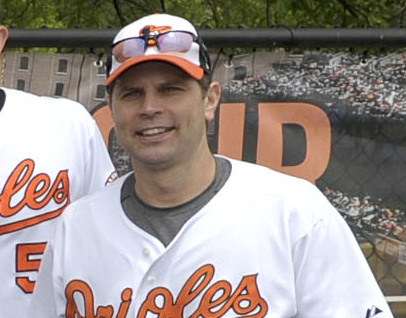
- Krivda in 2016
- Pitcher
- Born: January 19, 1970 (age 56); McKeesport, Pennsylvania, U.S.
- Batted: Right Threw: Left

MLB debut
- July 7, 1995, for the Baltimore Orioles

Last MLB appearance
- September 8, 1998, for the Cincinnati Reds

MLB statistics
- Win–loss record: 11–16
- Earned run average: 5.57
- Strikeouts: 165
- Stats at Baseball Reference

Teams
- Baltimore Orioles (1995–1997); Cleveland Indians (1998); Cincinnati Reds (1998)
Medals
Men's baseball
Representing United States
Olympic Games
Gold medal – first place	2000 Sydney	Team

Richard Michael Krivda (born January 19, 1970) is an American former baseball pitcher. Krivda pitched 12 years in professional baseball and won a gold medal in the 2000 Olympics.

Krivda graduated from McKeesport High School in 1988. He then went on to California University of Pennsylvania. After college, he was picked in the 23rd round of the 1991 amateur draft by the Baltimore Orioles.

== 1991–1993: Rushing through the minors ==
Krivda began his professional career with the Bluefield Orioles of Bluefield, West Virginia and went 7–1 with a 1.88 ERA. He was fifth in the Appalachian League in ERA and two wins shy of the lead. He saved one game, allowed only 48 hits in 67 innings and fanned 79. In 1992, Krivda emerged as a strong prospect. He went 12–5 with a 3.03 ERA for the Kane County Cougars, striking out a batter per inning, then was 5–1 with a 2.98 ERA in 9 starts after being promoted to the Frederick Keys. He continued to whiff over a batter per inning. His 188 strikeouts and 17 wins led the Orioles minor leaguers.

Krivda continued his fast rise through the minors in 1993. He was 7–5 with a 3.08 ERA for the Bowie Baysox and 3–0 with a 1.89 ERA in 5 starts for the Rochester Red Wings. He walked 16 in 33 1/3 innings with Rochester but allowed only 20 hits. He had made it to AAA and done well there in just his second full season in the minor leagues. He was second in the Eastern League in ERA, trailing only Denny Harriger and beating out top prospects Brien Taylor and Frank Rodriguez. Krivda got the start for the American League affiliate team for the Double-A All-Star Game and allowed two runs in two innings in a 12–7 loss. Baseball America rated Krivda as having the best breaking ball in the EL.

== 1994–1997: Rochester and Baltimore rotation ==
At age 24, Krivda spent a full year at Triple-A, one of six in which he would perform in Rochester. He had a 9–10, 3.53 record and was ninth in the International League in ERA. In the 1994 Triple-A All-Star Game, he threw a scoreless inning and struck out two. Krivda was 6–5 with a 3.19 ERA for the 1995 Red Wings. He made his major league debut July 7, 1995. He was 2–2 with a 3.24 ERA after his first eight starts, but lost five in a row to finish 2–7 with a 4.54 ERA. His secondary stats were not bad and his ERA+ was 108.

Back in Rochester to begin 1996, Krivda had a 3–1, 4.30 record when Baltimore came calling again. He went 3–5 with a 4.96 ERA in 22 games for the Orioles; the 81 2/3 innings he pitched marked a career high in the majors. His ERA+ remained respectable at 99.

In 1997, Krivda dazzled with Rochester, going 14–2 with a 3.39 ERA, walking only 34 in 146 innings. He finished fifth in the International League in ERA and led the league in both complete games (6) and shutouts (3). He had a chance to lead the league in wins as well but spent the last couple months of the year with Baltimore. He had a 4–2, 6.30 record in 10 starts for the Orioles, a significant decline from his first two cracks at the majors.

== 1998: Major leagues in Ohio ==
Krivda was claimed off waivers by the Indians from the Orioles on March 24, 1998. He was 2–0 with a 3.24 ERA in 11 outings for the Indians, but walked 16 in 25 innings. He was then traded in mid-June to the Cincinnati Reds for Eddie Priest and Christian Rojas. Krivda was only 0–2 with an 11.28 ERA for the Reds. His big-league career was over with a total record of 11–16, 5.57. His last major league game was September 8, 1998.

== 1999–2003: Back on the farm and Olympic Gold ==
The Kansas City Royals signed the left-hander in 1999, and the 29-year-old went 6–8 with a 5.70 ERA for the Omaha Royals, getting rapped for 154 hits in 115 1/3 IP, clearly past his peak.

Krivda returned to his old home of Rochester in 2000 and had an 11–9, 3.12 record to head the staff and show a return to form. He was second in the IL in ERA, trailing only Tomo Ohka. He missed time to represent the US in the 2000 Olympics. He took the team's lone loss, a 6–1 defeat by Cuba — Krivda allowed five hits, a walk and two runs in two innings. It was his only appearance in the Olympics. The USA still won gold handily.

Krivda was 4–6 with a 4.35 ERA for the Memphis Redbirds in 2001. Not pitching in 2002, Krivda played in independent league ball in 2003 with the Somerset Patriots (3–6, 6.28) and San Angelo Colts (1-1, 2.37) to finish his pro career with a 102–66 record, 91–50 in the minors.

== Post-career notes ==
On December 29, 2006, the city of McKeesport unveiled a monument to Krivda and to women's basketball star Swin Cash, the two Olympic athletes from McKeesport.
