= Sean Lawrence =

American baseball player (born 1970)

- Pitcher
- Born: September 2, 1970 (age 55); Oak Park, Illinois, U.S.
- Batted: Left Threw: Left

MLB debut
- August 25, 1998, for the Pittsburgh Pirates

Last MLB appearance
- September 22, 1998, for the Pittsburgh Pirates

MLB statistics
- Win–loss record: 2–1
- Earned run average: 7.32
- Strikeouts: 12
- Stats at Baseball Reference

Teams
- Pittsburgh Pirates (1998)

Sean Christopher Lawrence (born September 2, 1970) is an American former Major League Baseball pitcher. He played during one season at the major league level for the Pittsburgh Pirates. He was drafted by the Pirates in the 6th round of the 1992 amateur draft. Lawrence played his first professional season with their Class A (Short Season) Welland Pirates in 1992, and his last season with the Triple-A affiliates of the Arizona Diamondbacks (Tucson Sidewinders) and San Diego Padres (Portland Beavers) in 2001.
