= Ricardo Rincón =

Mexican baseball player (born 1970)

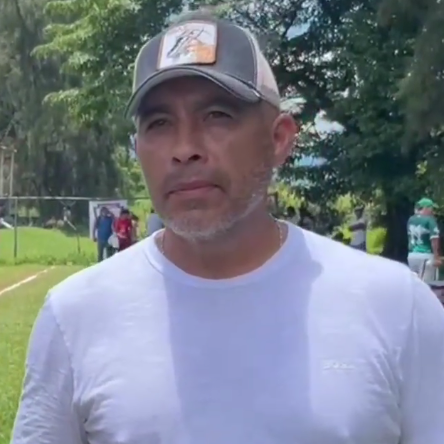
- Rincón in 2025
- Pitcher
- Born: April 13, 1970 (age 56); Atoyac, Veracruz, Mexico
- Batted: Left Threw: Left

MLB debut
- April 3, 1997, for the Pittsburgh Pirates

Last MLB appearance
- September 25, 2008, for the New York Mets

MLB statistics
- Win–loss record: 21–24
- Earned run average: 3.59
- Strikeouts: 400
- Stats at Baseball Reference

Teams
- Pittsburgh Pirates (1997–1998); Cleveland Indians (1999–2002); Oakland Athletics (2002–2005); St. Louis Cardinals (2006); New York Mets (2008)

Career highlights and awards
- Pitched a combined no-hitter on July 12, 1997

Ricardo Rincón Espinoza (born April 13, 1970) is a Mexican former professional baseball relief pitcher. He played in Major League Baseball for the Pittsburgh Pirates, Cleveland Indians, Oakland Athletics, St. Louis Cardinals, and New York Mets from 1997 to 2008.

== Career ==
Rincón was a left-handed specialist who spent nearly his entire career as a middle reliever and setup pitcher. In his 11-year career, Rincón never started a game and only accumulated 21 saves; he is generally credited with 109 holds. Rincón played for several teams in Mexico before being signed by the Pittsburgh Pirates in 1997, breaking into the major leagues at the relatively advanced age of 27.

Rincón was part of a combined no-hitter on July 12, 1997. After Francisco Córdova threw nine innings of no-hit ball, Rincón relieved him and pitched a scoreless 10th. Teammate Mark Smith then hit a three-run walk-off home run in the bottom of the 10th to give Rincón the win. To date, it is the last no-hitter in Pirates history.

On November 18, 1998, the Pirates traded Rincón to the Cleveland Indians for outfielder Brian Giles. On July 30, 2002, the Indians traded him to the Oakland Athletics for Marshall McDougall. He later pitched for the St. Louis Cardinals and New York Mets.

Rincón played for his native Mexico in the 2006 World Baseball Classic, appearing in four games. Shortly after the Classic and five games into his Cardinal career, Rincón experienced shoulder pain and later underwent surgery to repair a torn labrum and rotator cuff. He also had Tommy John surgery on his left elbow, forcing him to miss the remainder of the 2006 season. He played in the San Francisco Giants organization in 2007. On January 25, 2008, Rincón signed with the New York Mets. He was loaned to the Mexico City Red Devils for the 2008 season, and was returned on August 28 and assigned to Triple-A New Orleans. Rincón played for Mexico in the 2009 World Baseball Classic and then for several teams in Mexico before retiring in 2012.

He threw a four-seam fastball, slider, changeup, and two-seam fastball. He is currently married to his wife Jaqueline, they have two children, a daughter, Damaris, and a son, Ricardo, Jr.

He is a subject of the 2003 book Moneyball: The Art of Winning an Unfair Game and the 2011 film based on the book.

== Notes ==
Preceded by Kevin Brown	No-hit game July 12, 1997 (with Francisco Córdova)	Succeeded by David Wells
