= Francisco Córdova (baseball) =

Mexican baseball player (born 1972)

- Pitcher
- Born: April 26, 1972 (age 53); Cerro Azul, Veracruz, Mexico
- Batted: Right Threw: Right

MLB debut
- April 2, 1996, for the Pittsburgh Pirates

Last MLB appearance
- August 8, 2000, for the Pittsburgh Pirates

MLB statistics
- Win–loss record: 42–47
- Earned run average: 3.96
- Strikeouts: 537
- Stats at Baseball Reference

Teams
- Pittsburgh Pirates (1996–2000)

Career highlights and awards
- Pitched a combined no-hitter on July 12, 1997
Medals
Men's baseball
Representing Mexico
Pan American Games
Bronze medal – third place	2003 Santo Domingo	Team competition

Francisco Córdova (born April 26, 1972) is a Mexican former Major League Baseball right-handed starting pitcher.

== Career ==
On January 18, 1996, Córdova was signed by the Pittsburgh Pirates as an amateur free agent. He made his major league debut on April 2, 1996. The following year, on July 12, 1997, at a sold out Three Rivers Stadium, he pitched nine innings of a combined 10-inning no-hitter for the Pirates. Ricardo Rincón pitched the 10th inning. The Pirates won the game on a dramatic three-run, pinch hit home run in the bottom of the 10th by Mark Smith. This game pitched by Córdova and Rincón is recognized as the only combined, extra-inning no-hitter in modern MLB history and is the last no-hitter in Pirates history to date. Córdova would go on to post an 11–8 record that season. He would post a 13–14 record in 1998, to go with a 3.31 ERA.

His career was shorted by arm troubles. After going through reconstructive elbow surgery in 2001, and missing the entire 2002 season, he signed with the San Diego Padres before the 2003 season, but failed to make the team after spring training and he retired with a 42–47 record.

After his MLB stint, Cordova pitched in his native Mexico from 2002 through 2011 with the Mexico City Tigres, the Mexico City Diablos Rojos, and the Petroleros de Minatitlán.

Preceded by Kevin Brown	No-hit game July 12, 1997 (with Ricardo Rincón)	Succeeded by David Wells
