= 2010 New York Yankees season =

Season for the Major League Baseball team the New York Yankees

2010 New York Yankees
- American League Wild Card winners
- League: American League
- Division: East
- Ballpark: Yankee Stadium
- City: New York, New York
- Record: 95–67 (.586)
- Divisional place: 2nd
- Owners: Yankee Global Enterprises
- General managers: Brian Cashman
- Managers: Joe Girardi
- Television: YES Network; WWOR-TV (Michael Kay, Ken Singleton, several others as analysts)
- Radio: New York Yankees Radio Network (John Sterling, Suzyn Waldman)

The 2010 New York Yankees season was the 108th season for the New York Yankees franchise. The Yankees were attempting to defend its status as American League and World Series champions, but lost in the ALCS to the Texas Rangers, marking a 1 year championship drought. The Yankees opened and closed the regular season against the Boston Red Sox at Fenway Park. This marked the first time since 1950 this happened. The Yankees and the Los Angeles Dodgers renewed their rivalry as the Bronx Bombers traveled west to face former Yankee icons Joe Torre and Don Mattingly, both of them current and future Dodgers managers.

The Yankees' regular season record for 2010 was 95 wins, 67 losses, second place in the American League East behind Tampa Bay and good for the AL Wild Card.

== Offseason ==
- Following the Yankees' 2009 World Series championship, Johnny Damon and Hideki Matsui departed as free agents.
- On December 8, the New York Yankees acquired center fielder Curtis Granderson from the Detroit Tigers, trading pitcher Ian Kennedy to the Arizona Diamondbacks and pitcher Phil Coke and minor league outfielder Austin Jackson to Detroit.
- On December 9, pitcher Andy Pettitte signed a $11.75 million contract for one year.
- On December 22, the Yankees traded outfielder Melky Cabrera, pitcher Michael Dunn, and minor league pitcher Arodys Vizcaíno to the Atlanta Braves for pitchers Javier Vázquez and Boone Logan.
- On December 23, designated hitter and first baseman Nick Johnson signed a $5.5 million contract to return to New York for one year, 6 years after being traded from the Yankees to the then Montreal Expos, now the Washington Nationals.
- On January 27, outfielder Randy Winn signed with the Yankees on a one-year contract worth $2 million.
- On February 16, the Yankees announced that pitcher Dustin Moseley signed a minor league contract with an invitation to spring training.
- On February 28, pitcher Chan Ho Park signed a $1.2 million, one-year deal with an additional $300,000 in incentives. To make room for Park on the 40-man roster, pitcher Edwar Ramírez was designated for assignment.

== Midseason acquisitions ==
- On July 30, the Yankees acquired Austin Kearns from the Cleveland Indians for a player to be named later. On August 20, the player was revealed to be Zach McAllister.
- On July 31, the Yankees traded minor leaguers Mark Melancon and Jimmy Paredes to the Houston Astros for first baseman Lance Berkman.
- On July 31, the Yankees acquired Kerry Wood from the Cleveland Indians for a player to be named later or cash considerations.

=== Roster ===
2010 New York Yankees
Roster
Pitchers: 91 Alfredo Aceves; 63 Jonathan Albaladejo; 34 A. J. Burnett; 62 Joba Chamberlain; 41 Chad Gaudin; 65 Phil Hughes; 48 Boone Logan; 43 Dámaso Marte; 39 Mark Melancon; 45 Sergio Mitre; 40 Dustin Moseley; 41,47 Iván Nova; 61 Chan Ho Park; 46 Andy Pettitte; 61 Royce Ring; 42 Mariano Rivera; 30 David Robertson; 52 CC Sabathia; 47,64 Rómulo Sánchez; 31 Javier Vázquez; 39 Kerry Wood	Catchers: 29 Francisco Cervelli; 17,18 Chad Moeller; 20 Jorge Posada; Infielders: 17 Lance Berkman; 24 Robinson Canó; 2 Derek Jeter; 26,36 Nick Johnson; 53 Juan Miranda; 12 Eduardo Núñez; 19 Ramiro Peña; 13 Alex Rodriguez; 26,27,60 Kevin Russo; 25 Mark Teixeira	Outfielders: 22,27 Colin Curtis; 11 Brett Gardner; 26,27 Greg Golson; 14 Curtis Granderson; 22 Chad Huffman; 26 Austin Kearns; 33 Nick Swisher; 38 Marcus Thames; 22 Randy Winn	Manager: 28 Joe Girardi; Coaches: 58 Dave Eiland (pitching); 57 Mike Harkey (bullpen); 50 Mick Kelleher (1st base); 54 Kevin Long (hitting); 56 Tony Peña (bench); 59 Rob Thomson (3rd base)

== Regular season ==
=== Season standings ===
==== American League East ====
AL East
Team	W	L	Pct.	GB	Home	Road
Tampa Bay Rays	96	66	.593	—	49‍–‍32	47‍–‍34
New York Yankees	95	67	.586	1	52‍–‍29	43‍–‍38
Boston Red Sox	89	73	.549	7	46‍–‍35	43‍–‍38
Toronto Blue Jays	85	77	.525	11	45‍–‍33	40‍–‍44
Baltimore Orioles	66	96	.407	30	37‍–‍44	29‍–‍52

==== American League Wild Card ====
Division winners
Team	W	L	Pct.
Tampa Bay Rays	96	66	.593
Minnesota Twins	94	68	.580
Texas Rangers	90	72	.556

Wild Card team (Top team qualifies for postseason)
Team	W	L	Pct.	GB
New York Yankees	95	67	.586	—
Boston Red Sox	89	73	.549	6
Chicago White Sox	88	74	.543	7
Toronto Blue Jays	85	77	.525	10
Detroit Tigers	81	81	.500	14
Oakland Athletics	81	81	.500	14
Los Angeles Angels	80	82	.494	15
Cleveland Indians	69	93	.426	26
Kansas City Royals	67	95	.414	28
Baltimore Orioles	66	96	.407	29
Seattle Mariners	61	101	.377	34

==== Record vs. opponents ====
2010 American League record Source: MLB Standings Grid – 2010
Team	BAL	BOS	CWS	CLE	DET	KC	LAA	MIN	NYY	OAK	SEA	TB	TEX	TOR	NL
Baltimore	–	9–9	4–3	3–3	5–5	2–4	6–0	3–5	5–13	3–7	3–6	7–11	6–4	3–15	7–11
Boston	9–9	–	1–6	4–4	3–3	4–3	9–1	3–2	9–9	4–5	7–3	7–11	4–6	12–6	13–5
Chicago	3–4	6–1	–	9–9	8–10	10–8	7–2	5–13	2–4	4–5	9–1	3–4	4–5	3–5	15–3
Cleveland	3–3	4–4	9–9	–	9–9	10–8	5–4	6–12	2–6	3–6	3–4	2–7	2–4	6–4	5–13
Detroit	5–5	3–3	10–8	9–9	–	10–8	6–4	9–9	4–4	3–3	3–5	1–6	3–6	4–4	11–7
Kansas City	4–2	3-4	9–10	8–10	8–10	–	3-7	5–13	3–5	3–6	5–4	4–4	2–7	3–3	8–10
Los Angeles	0–6	1–9	2–7	4–5	4–6	7–3	–	2–5	4–4	11–8	15–4	4–5	9–10	6–3	11–7
Minnesota	5–3	2–3	13–5	12–6	9–9	13–5	5–2	–	2–4	6–3	6-4	3–5	7–3	3–6	8–10
New York	13–5	9–9	4–2	6-2	4–4	5–3	4–4	4–2	–	9–1	6–4	8–10	4–4	8–10	11–7
Oakland	7–3	5–4	5–4	6–3	3–3	6–3	8–11	3–6	1–9	–	13–6	4–5	9–10	3–4	8–10
Seattle	6–3	3–7	1–9	4–3	5–3	4–5	4–15	4–6	4–6	6–13	–	2–7	7–12	2–3	9–9
Tampa Bay	11–7	11–7	4–3	7–2	6–1	4–4	5–4	5–3	10–8	5–4	7–2	–	4–2	10–8	7–11
Texas	4–6	6–4	5–4	4–2	6–3	7–2	10-9	3-7	4-4	10-9	12–7	2–4	–	3–7	14–4
Toronto	15–3	6–12	5–3	4–6	4–4	3–3	3–6	6–3	10–8	4–3	3–2	8–10	7–3	–	7–11

- Source: MLB Standings Grid – 2010

=== Season highlights ===
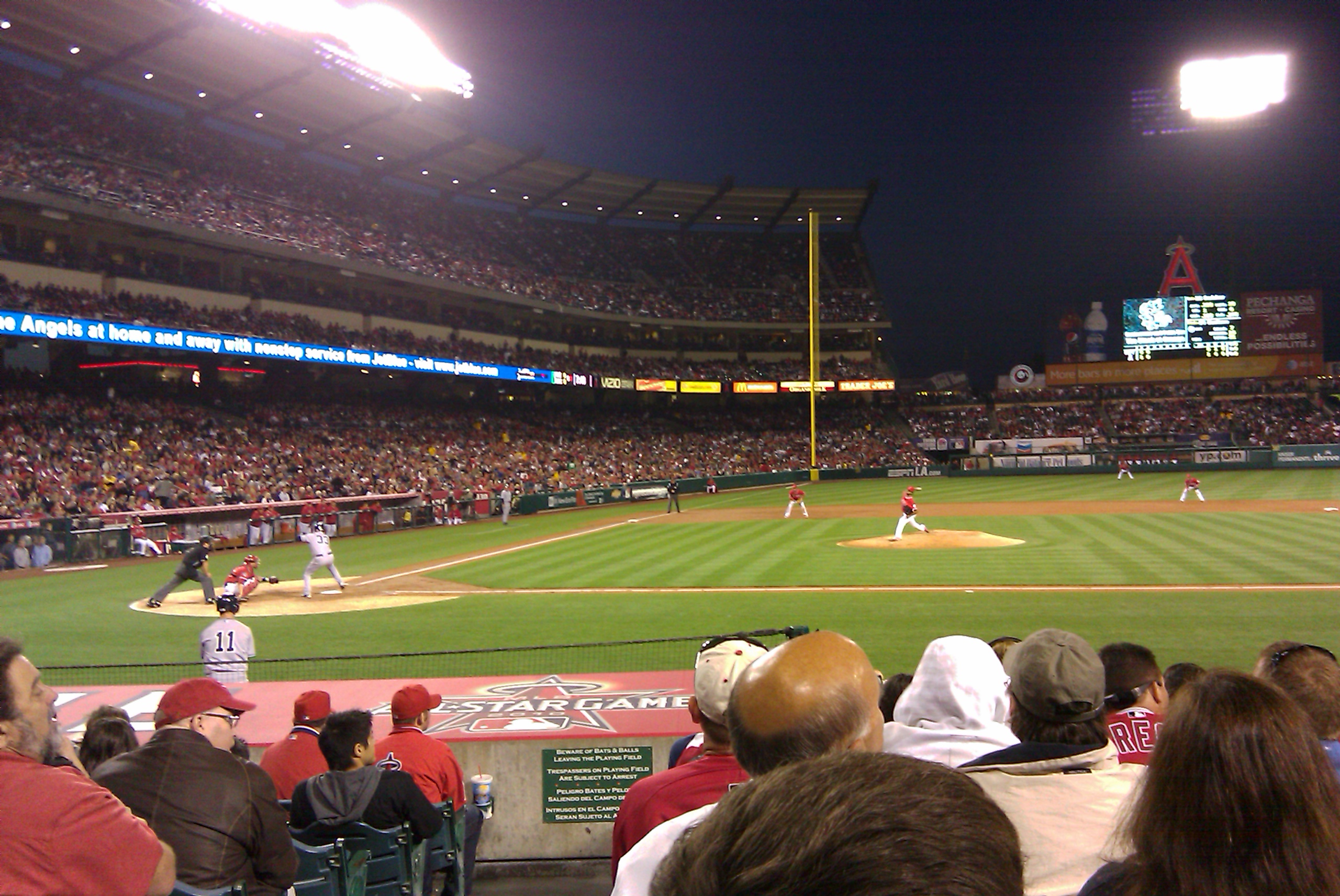
Nick Swisher bats against the Angels whilst Brett Gardner waits on deck.

==== April ====
With the series win in Oakland clinched, the club matched the 1926 Yankees' all-time franchise record by winning each of the first five series of the season. Only one other club in team history started with as many as four series wins in a row, the 1922 Yankees. Both of those teams made it to the World Series, although they lost. During this time, the Yankees tied an April record of 12 straight error-less games, from April 7 to 22. On April 22 against the Oakland Athletics the Yankees turned a triple play for the first time since June 3, 1968.

==== May ====
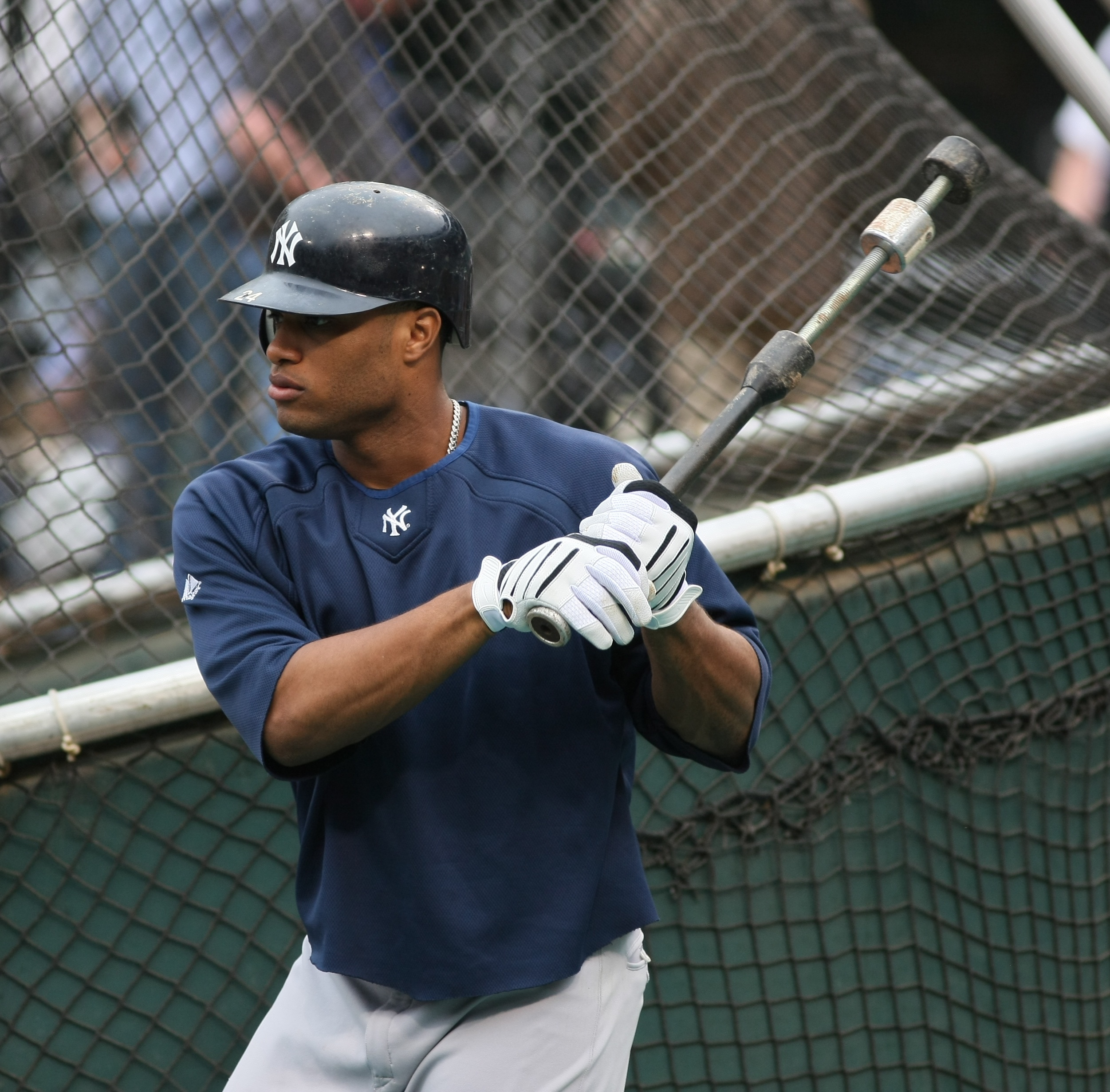
Robinson Canó was an MVP candidate.

On May 8, Mark Teixeira hit 3 home runs against the Red Sox, becoming only the second Yankee player in history since Lou Gehrig to accomplish the feat.

==== June ====
On June 11, Andy Pettitte won his 200th game as a Yankee, becoming the third player to achieve the feat. The other two players are Yankee pitching legends Red Ruffing (231) and Whitey Ford (236). During the last 2 games against the Astros, Jorge Posada hit grand slams in back-to-back games becoming the third Yankee player to do so. The other two players are Baseball Hall of Fame members and Yankee legends Babe Ruth and Bill Dickey.

==== July ====
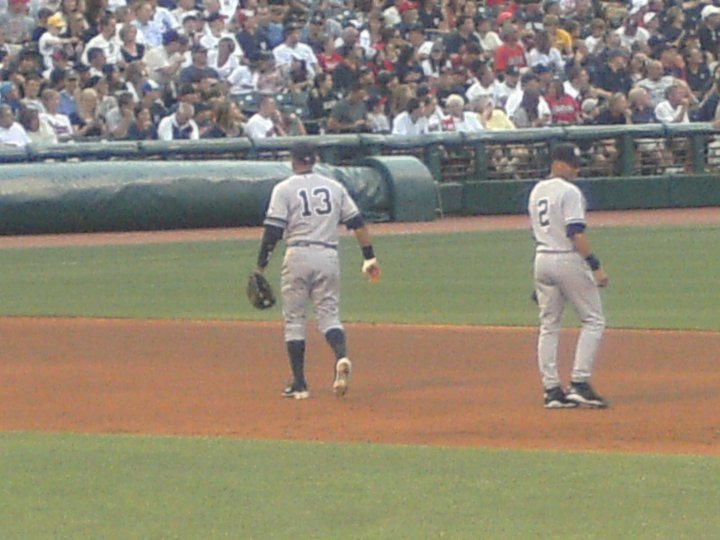
Derek Jeter and Alex Rodriguez play the field against the Cleveland Indians on July 29, 2010. Rodriguez would hit his 600th career homer a few days later.

Brett Gardner became the first player in MLB history to hit a grand slam and an inside-the-park home run during back-to-back games on July 3–4.

The Yankees suffered three great losses during the month of July, two of which happened during the All-Star weekend. First, on July 11, longtime Yankee Stadium public address announcer Bob Sheppard died at age 99. Then just two days later on July 13, longtime owner George Steinbrenner died at age 80. Steinbrenner was the longest tenured owner in Yankees history and among active ownership. On July 21, former Yankee manager and executive Ralph Houk died.

On July 18, the Yankees were 58–33, their best 91-game record since the 1998 season, when they were 68–23, en route to a then American League record 114 wins, and a World Series victory over the Padres in 4 games.

Against the Royals on July 22, Derek Jeter hit only the second inside-the-park home run of his career, in a 10–4 Yankee win – his first came in his rookie year. The next day, Jorge Posada drove in his 1,000th career RBI against the Royals, becoming only the 12th Yankee to join the 1,000 RBI club and became one of three Yankees catchers to reach that mark, along with Yogi Berra (1,430) and Bill Dickey (1,209). Posada also became just the 5th catcher in MLB history with 1,000 RBI, 350 doubles and 250 home runs. The other four are Carlton Fisk, Iván Rodríguez, Johnny Bench and Gary Carter.

On July 25, Robinson Canó recorded his 1,000th career hit, becoming the third-quickest homegrown Yankees player – behind Derek Jeter and Don Mattingly – to reach that plateau.

==== August ====
On August 4, Alex Rodriguez hit his 600th career home run against the Toronto Blue Jays, becoming the youngest player in history to do so.

On August 8, Derek Jeter passed Babe Ruth on the all-time hits list when he knocked in a second-inning single collecting his 2,874th hit. He is the first Yankee to hold the Major League lead in hits among active players since Johnny Mize in 1952, according to the Elias Sports Bureau. During the same game against the Red Sox, Alex Rodriguez recorded his 300th career stolen base, making Rodriguez the 10th player in baseball history with at least 1,500 runs scored, 2,500 hits, 200 home runs and 300 stolen bases. Rodriguez joined a select group in that category -- Jeter, Damon, Bonds, Biggio, Alomar, Rickey Henderson, Molitor, Joe Morgan and Mays—but only A-Rod, Mays and Bonds have hit as many as 600 homers to go along with the 300 steals.

Against the Kansas City Royals on August 14, Rodriguez hit 3 home runs in a game for the 4th time in his career.

On August 22, Sabathia recorded his 16th consecutive start of at least six innings allowing three earned runs or less, breaking a tie with Ron Guidry (from his Cy Young Award-winning 1978 season for the longest streak in franchise history).

==== September and October ====
On September 18, CC Sabathia notched his 20th win for the first time in his career. He also became the first pitcher in 2010 to reach 20 wins.

On September 24, A-Rod notched career home runs #609 and #610, putting him in sole possession of 6th place on the all-time home run list. The blasts put him one home run ahead of MLB great Sammy Sosa. Also on this date, Mark Teixeira and A-Rod, who have been teammates for 3 years (2003 with Rangers, and 2009–10 with Yankees), hit two home runs in a game each for the first time.

On September 28, the Yankees clinched a playoff berth for the 15th time in the last 16 seasons. However, they lost the division crown to the Tampa Bay Rays on the last day of the season after an 8–4 loss to the Red Sox, thus they were the Wild Card. Losing 17 of their last 26 games, the Yankees failed to clinch the AL East after holding the lead on Labor Day for the first time since 1944.

== Postseason ==
=== Division Series ===
The Yankees faced the Twins in the ALDS, and swept them in 3 games. This was the fourth time both teams have met in the postseason, with the Yankees winning all four matchups: a 3–1 Yankees win in 2003, a 3–1 Yankees win in 2004, and a Yankees sweep in 2009. However, this was the first time the Twins held home-field advantage, as the Yankees qualified for the Wild Card, while the Twins won the American League Central.

==== Game 1, October 6 ====
8:30 p.m. (EDT) at Target Field in Minneapolis, Minnesota

Team	1	2	3	4	5	6	7	8	9	R	H	E
New York	0	0	0	0	0	4	2	0	0	6	9	0
Minnesota	0	2	1	0	0	1	0	0	0	4	8	0
Starting pitchers: NYY: CC Sabathia (0–0); MIN: Francisco Liriano (0–0) --> WP: CC Sabathia (1–0) LP: Jesse Crain (0–1) Sv: Mariano Rivera (1); Home runs: NYY: Mark Teixeira (1); MIN: Michael Cuddyer (1)

==== Game 2, October 7 ====
6:00 p.m. (EDT) at Target Field in Minneapolis, Minnesota

Team	1	2	3	4	5	6	7	8	9	R	H	E
New York	0	0	0	1	1	0	2	0	1	5	12	0
Minnesota	0	1	0	0	0	1	0	0	0	2	6	0
Starting pitchers: NYY: Andy Pettitte (0–0); MIN: Carl Pavano (0–0) --> WP: Andy Pettitte (1–0) LP: Carl Pavano (0–1) Sv: Mariano Rivera (2); Home runs: NYY: Lance Berkman (1); MIN: Orlando Hudson (1)

==== Game 3, October 9 ====
8:30 p.m. (EDT) at Yankee Stadium in the Bronx, New York

Team	1	2	3	4	5	6	7	8	9	R	H	E
Minnesota	0	0	0	0	0	0	0	1	0	1	7	1
New York	0	1	1	3	0	0	1	0	X	6	12	0
Starting pitchers: MIN: Brian Duensing (0–0); NYY: Phil Hughes (0–0) --> WP: Phil Hughes (1–0) LP: Brian Duensing (0–1); Home runs: MIN: None; NYY: Marcus Thames (1), Nick Swisher (1)

=== American League Championship Series ===
The Yankees faced the Texas Rangers in the 2010 ALCS, which began Friday, October 15. The Rangers won the series in six games, eliminating the Yankees and preventing them from defending their title.

==== Game 1 ====
Friday, October 15, 2010 – 8:00 p.m. (EDT) at Rangers Ballpark in Arlington in Arlington, Texas

Team	1	2	3	4	5	6	7	8	9	R	H	E
New York	0	0	0	0	0	0	1	5	0	6	10	1
Texas	3	0	0	2	0	0	0	0	0	5	6	1
Starting pitchers: NYY: CC Sabathia (0–0); TEX: C. J. Wilson (0–0) --> WP: Dustin Moseley (1–0) LP: Darren O'Day (0–1) Sv: Mariano Rivera (1); Home runs: NYY: Robinson Canó (1); TEX: Josh Hamilton (1)

==== Game 2 ====
Saturday, October 16, 2010 – 4:00 p.m. (EDT) at Rangers Ballpark in Arlington in Arlington, Texas

Team	1	2	3	4	5	6	7	8	9	R	H	E
New York	0	0	0	1	0	1	0	0	0	2	7	0
Texas	1	2	2	0	2	0	0	0	X	7	12	0
WP: Colby Lewis (1–0) LP: Phil Hughes (0–1); Home runs: NYY: Robinson Canó (2); TEX: David Murphy (1)

==== Game 3 ====
Monday, October 18, 2010 – 8:00 p.m. (EDT) at Yankee Stadium in the Bronx, New York

Team	1	2	3	4	5	6	7	8	9	R	H	E
Texas	2	0	0	0	0	0	0	0	6	8	11	0
New York	0	0	0	0	0	0	0	0	0	0	2	0
Starting pitchers: TEX: Cliff Lee (0–0); NYY: Andy Pettitte (0–0) --> WP: Cliff Lee (1–0) LP: Andy Pettitte (0–1); Home runs: TEX: Josh Hamilton (2); NYY: None

==== Game 4 ====
Tuesday, October 19, 2010 – 8:00 p.m. (EDT) at Yankee Stadium in the Bronx, New York

Team	1	2	3	4	5	6	7	8	9	R	H	E
Texas	0	0	2	0	0	3	2	0	3	10	13	0
New York	0	1	1	1	0	0	0	0	0	3	7	0
WP: Derek Holland (1–0) LP: A. J. Burnett (0–1) Sv: Darren Oliver (1); Home runs: TEX: Bengie Molina (1), Josh Hamilton 2 (4), Nelson Cruz (1); NYY: Robinson Canó (3)

==== Game 5 ====
Wednesday, October 20, 2010 – 4:07 p.m. (EDT) at Yankee Stadium in the Bronx, New York

Team	1	2	3	4	5	6	7	8	9	R	H	E
Texas	0	0	0	0	1	1	0	0	0	2	13	1
New York	0	3	2	0	1	0	0	1	X	7	9	0
Starting pitchers: TEX: C. J. Wilson (0–0); NYY: CC Sabathia (0–0) --> WP: CC Sabathia (1–0) LP: C. J. Wilson (0–1); Home runs: TEX: Matt Treanor (1); NYY: Nick Swisher (1), Robinson Canó (4), Curtis Granderson (1)

==== Game 6 ====
Friday, October 22, 2010 – 8:07 p.m. (EDT) at Rangers Ballpark in Arlington in Arlington, Texas

Team	1	2	3	4	5	6	7	8	9	R	H	E
New York	0	0	0	0	1	0	0	0	0	1	3	0
Texas	1	0	0	0	4	0	1	0	X	6	7	0
WP: Colby Lewis (2-0) LP: Phil Hughes (0-2); Home runs: NYY: none TEX: Nelson Cruz (2)

== Statistics ==
=== Game log ===
Legend
Yankees Win	Yankees Loss	Game Postponed

2010 Game Log
April (15–7)

#	Date	Opponent	Score	Win	Loss	Save	Attendance	Record
1	April 4	@ Red Sox	7–9	Okajima (1–0)	Park (0–1)	Papelbon (1)	37,440	0–1
2	April 6	@ Red Sox	6–4	Aceves (1–0)	Okajima (1–1)	Rivera (1)	38,000	1–1
3	April 7	@ Red Sox	3–1 (10)	Park (1–1)	Papelbon (0–1)	Rivera (2)	38,238	2–1
4	April 9	@ Rays	3–9	Price (1–0)	Vázquez (0–1)		33,221	2–2
5	April 10	@ Rays	10–0	Sabathia (1–0)	Davis (0–1)		29,892	3–2
6	April 11	@ Rays	7–3	Burnett (1–0)	Choate (0–1)		31,253	4–2
7	April 13	Angels	7–5	Pettitte (1–0)	Santana (0–2)	Rivera (3)	49,293	5–2
8	April 14	Angels	3–5	Piñeiro (1–1)	Vázquez (0–2)	Rodney (1)	42,372	5–3
9	April 15	Angels	6–2	Hughes (1–0)	Kazmir (0–1)	Rivera (4)	44,722	6–3
10	April 16	Rangers	5–1 (6)	Sabathia (2–0)	Wilson (0–1)		42,145	7–3
11	April 17	Rangers	7–3	Burnett (2–0)	Feldman (1–1)		44,963	8–3
12	April 18	Rangers	5–2	Pettitte (2–0)	Harden (0–1)	Rivera (5)	44,121	9–3
13	April 20	@ Athletics	7–3	Vázquez (1–2)	Gonzalez (1–1)		19,849	10–3
14	April 21	@ Athletics	3–1	Hughes (2–0)	Sheets (1–1)	Rivera (6)	30,211	11–3
15	April 22	@ Athletics	2–4	Braden (3–0)	Sabathia (2–1)	Bailey (2)	21,986	11–4
16	April 23	@ Angels	4–6	Rodney (2–0)	Chamberlain (0–1)	Fuentes (2)	44,002	11–5
17	April 24	@ Angels	7–1	Pettitte (3–0)	Piñeiro (2–2)		43,390	12–5
18	April 25	@ Angels	4–8	Kazmir (2–1)	Vázquez (1–3)		42,284	12–6
19	April 27	@ Orioles	4–5	Castillo (1–0)	Robertson (0–1)	Simón (1)	20,536	12–7
20	April 28	@ Orioles	8–3	Sabathia (3–1)	Guthrie (0–3)		17,248	13–7
21	April 29	@ Orioles	4–0	Burnett (3–0)	Matusz (2–1)		26,439	14–7
22	April 30	White Sox	6–4	Aceves (2–0)	Thornton (2–2)	Rivera (7)	44,783	15–7

May (16–13)

#	Date	Opponent	Score	Win	Loss	Save	Attendance	Record
23	May 1	White Sox	6–7	Linebrink (1–0)	Robertson (0–2)	Jenks (5)	45,265	15–8
24	May 2	White Sox	12–3	Hughes (3–0)	Buehrle (2–4)		45,303	16–8
25	May 3	Orioles	4–1	Sabathia (4–1)	Guthrie (0–4)	Chamberlain (1)	41,571	17–8
26	May 4	Orioles	4–1	Burnett (4–0)	Matusz (2–2)	Chamberlain (2)	43,260	18–8
27	May 5	Orioles	7–5	Pettitte (4–0)	Hernandez (0–4)	Aceves (1)	43,425	19–8
28	May 7	@ Red Sox	10–3	Hughes (4–0)	Beckett (1–1)		37,898	20–8
29	May 8	@ Red Sox	14–3	Aceves (3–0)	Buchholz (3–3)		37,138	21–8
30	May 9	@ Red Sox	3–9	Lester (3–2)	Burnett (4–1)		37,618	21–9
31	May 10	@ Tigers	4–5	Bonine (3–0)	Mitre (0–1)	Valverde (9)	34,365	21–10
	May 11	@ Tigers	Postponed (rain). Rescheduled for May 12					
32	May 12	@ Tigers	0–2	Porcello (3–3)	Vázquez (1–4)	Valverde (10)	27,376	21–11
33	May 12	@ Tigers	8–0	Hughes (5–0)	Bonderman (1–2)		28,514	22–11
34	May 13	@ Tigers	0–6	Verlander (4–2)	Sabathia (4–2)		31,130	22–12
35	May 14	Twins	8–4	Chamberlain (1–1)	Baker (4–3)		45,195	23–12
36	May 15	Twins	7–1	Pettitte (5–0)	Liriano (4–2)		46,347	24–12
37	May 16	Twins	3–6	Blackburn (4–1)	Chamberlain (1–2)	Rauch (10)	46,628	24–13
38	May 17	Red Sox	11–9	Vázquez (2–4)	Papelbon (1–3)		48,271	25–13
39	May 18	Red Sox	6–7	Bard (1–1)	Rivera (0–1)	Papelbon (10)	47,734	25–14
40	May 19	Rays	6–10	Davis (4–3)	Burnett (4–2)	Benoit (1)	43,283	25–15
41	May 20	Rays	6–8	Shields (5–1)	Pettitte (5–1)	Soriano (11)	45,483	25–16
42	May 21	@ Mets	2–1	Vázquez (3–4)	Dessens (0–1)	Rivera (8)	41,382	26–16
43	May 22	@ Mets	3–5	Pelfrey (6–1)	Hughes (5–1)	Rodríguez (7)	41,343	26–17
44	May 23	@ Mets	4–6	Santana (4–2)	Sabathia (4–3)	Rodríguez (8)	41,422	26–18
	May 25	@ Twins	Suspended (rain). Completed on May 26					
45	May 26	@ Twins	1–0	Burnett (5–2)	Duensing (2–1)	Rivera (9)	38,962	27–18
46	May 26	@ Twins	3–2	Pettitte (6–1)	Rauch (1–1)	Rivera (10)	39,353	28–18
47	May 27	@ Twins	2–8	Blackburn (6–1)	Vázquez (3–5)		39,087	28–19
48	May 28	Indians	8–2	Hughes (6–1)	Carmona (4–3)		44,634	29–19
49	May 29	Indians	11–13	Perez (1–0)	Chamberlain (1–3)	Wood (2)	46,599	29–20
50	May 30	Indians	7–3	Burnett (6–2)	Sipp (0–1)		45,706	30–20
51	May 31	Indians	11–2	Pettitte (7–1)	Talbot (6–4)		44,976	31–20

June (16–10)

#	Date	Opponent	Score	Win	Loss	Save	Attendance	Record
52	June 1	Orioles	3–1	Vázquez (4–5)	Matusz (2–6)	Rivera (11)	43,059	32–20
53	June 2	Orioles	9–1	Hughes (7–1)	Bergesen (3–4)		44,465	33–20
54	June 3	Orioles	6–3	Sabathia (5–3)	Millwood (0–6)	Rivera (12)	44,927	34–20
55	June 4	@ Blue Jays	1–6	Cecil (6–2)	Burnett (6–3)		30,089	34–21
56	June 5	@ Blue Jays	2–3 (14)	Janssen (4–0)	Gaudin (0–3)		37,165	34–22
57	June 6	@ Blue Jays	4–3	Vázquez (5–5)	Downs (1–5)	Rivera (13)	33,622	35–22
58	June 8	@ Orioles	12–7	Hughes (8–1)	Millwood (0–7)		23,171	36–22
59	June 9	@ Orioles	4–2	Sabathia (6–3)	Tillman (0–2)	Rivera (14)	16,451	37–22
60	June 10	@ Orioles	3–4	Arrieta (1–0)	Burnett (6–4)	Hernandez (1)	27,064	37–23
61	June 11	Astros	4–3	Pettitte (8–1)	Myers (4–4)	Rivera (15)	46,883	38–23
62	June 12	Astros	9–3	Vázquez (6–5)	Rodríguez (3–9)		46,159	39–23
63	June 13	Astros	9–5	Hughes (9–1)	Moehler (0–3)		46,832	40–23
64	June 15	Phillies	8–3	Sabathia (7–3)	Halladay (8–5)		47,135	41–23
65	June 16	Phillies	3–6	Moyer (7–6)	Burnett (6–5)		47,414	41–24
66	June 17	Phillies	1–7	Kendrick (4–2)	Pettitte (8–2)		47,204	41–25
67	June 18	Mets	0–4	Takahashi (6–2)	Vázquez (6–6)	Rodríguez (16)	49,220	41–26
68	June 19	Mets	5–3	Hughes (10–1)	Pelfrey (9–2)	Rivera (16)	49,073	42–26
69	June 20	Mets	4–0	Sabathia (8–3)	Santana (5–4)		49,240	43–26
70	June 21	@ Diamondbacks	4–10	López (3–6)	Burnett (6–6)		47,229	43–27
71	June 22	@ Diamondbacks	9–3	Pettitte (9–2)	Haren (7–6)		45,776	44–27
72	June 23	@ Diamondbacks	6–5 (10)	Rivera (1–1)	Rosa (0–2)		46,325	45–27
73	June 25	@ Dodgers	2–1	Sabathia (9–3)	Padilla (1–2)	Rivera (17)	56,000	46–27
74	June 26	@ Dodgers	4–9	Kuroda (7–5)	Burnett (6–7)		56,000	46–28
75	June 27	@ Dodgers	8–6 (10)	Rivera (2–1)	Troncoso (1–2)		56,000	47–28
76	June 29	Mariners	4–7	Lee (7–3)	Hughes (10–2)		45,780	47–29
77	June 30	Mariners	0–7	Hernández (6–5)	Vázquez (6–7)		46,309	47–30

July (19–7)

#	Date	Opponent	Score	Win	Loss	Save	Attendance	Record
78	July 1	Mariners	4–2	Sabathia (10–3)	Aardsma (0–5)	Rivera (18)	45,591	48–30
79	July 2	Blue Jays	1–6 (11)	Frasor (3–1)	Robertson (0–3)		45,792	48–31
80	July 3	Blue Jays	11–3	Pettitte (10–2)	Romero (6–5)		46,364	49–31
81	July 4	Blue Jays	7–6 (10)	Robertson (1–3)	Purcey (0–1)		46,810	50–31
82	July 5	@ Athletics	3–1	Vázquez (7–7)	Sheets (3–8)	Rivera (19)	27,405	51–31
83	July 6	@ Athletics	6–1	Sabathia (11–3)	Cahill (8–3)		29,473	52–31
84	July 7	@ Athletics	6–2	Burnett (7–7)	Gonzalez (7–6)		31,518	53–31
85	July 8	@ Mariners	3–1	Pettitte (11–2)	Aardsma (0–6)	Rivera (20)	37,432	54–31
86	July 9	@ Mariners	6–1	Hughes (11–2)	Pauly (0–1)		39,645	55–31
87	July 10	@ Mariners	1–4	Hernández (7–5)	Chamberlain (1–4)		42,558	55–32
88	July 11	@ Mariners	8–2	Sabathia (12–3)	Rowland-Smith (1–9)		42,069	56–32
All-Star Break: NL defeats AL 3–1
89	July 16	Rays	5–4	Rivera (3–1)	Choate (2–3)		47,524	57–32
90	July 17	Rays	5–10	Niemann (8–2)	Burnett (7–8)		48,957	57–33
91	July 18	Rays	9–5	Park (2–1)	Price (12–5)		46,969	58–33
92	July 20	Angels	2–10	O'Sullivan (1–0)	Hughes (11–3)		47,775	58–34
93	July 21	Angels	10–6	Vázquez (8–7)	Piñeiro (10–7)		47,521	59–34
94	July 22	Royals	10–4	Sabathia (13–3)	Chen (5–4)		47,484	60–34
95	July 23	Royals	7–1	Burnett (8–8)	Bannister (7–9)		46,801	61–34
96	July 24	Royals	4–7	Davies (5–6)	Mitre (0–2)	Soria (27)	48,138	61–35
97	July 25	Royals	12–6	Hughes (12–3)	O'Sullivan (1–1)		47,890	62–35
98	July 26	@ Indians	3–2	Vázquez (9–7)	Westbrook (6–7)	Rivera (21)	27,224	63–35
99	July 27	@ Indians	1–4	Tomlin 1–0	Sabathia (13–4)	C. Perez (10)	27,416	63–36
100	July 28	@ Indians	8–0	Burnett (9–8)	Carmona (10–8)		22,965	64–36
101	July 29	@ Indians	11–4	Moseley (1–0)	Herrmann (0–1)		34,455	65–36
102	July 30	@ Rays	2–3	Davis (9–9)	Hughes (12–4)	Soriano (29)	36,973	65–37
103	July 31	@ Rays	5–4	Robertson (2–3)	Soriano (2–1)	Rivera (22)	36,973	66–37

August (16–13)

#	Date	Opponent	Score	Win	Loss	Save	Attendance	Record
104	August 1	@ Rays	0–3	Shields (10–9)	Sabathia (13–5)	Soriano (30)	36,973	66–38
105	August 2	Blue Jays	6–8	Morrow (8–6)	Burnett (9–8)	Gregg (24)	47,034	66–39
106	August 3	Blue Jays	2–8	Romero (9–7)	Moseley (1–1)		46,480	66–40
107	August 4	Blue Jays	5–1	Hughes (13–4)	Marcum (10–5)		47,659	67–40
108	August 6	Red Sox	3–6	Buchholz (12–5)	Vázquez (9–8)	Papelbon (27)	49,555	67–41
109	August 7	Red Sox	5–2	Sabathia (14–5)	Lackey (10–7)	Rivera (23)	49,716	68–41
110	August 8	Red Sox	7–2	Moseley (2–1)	Beckett (3–2)		49,096	69–41
111	August 9	Red Sox	1–2	Lester (12–7)	Hughes (13–5)	Papelbon (28)	49,476	69–42
112	August 10	@ Rangers	3–4 (10)	Feliz (3–2)	Rivera (3–2)		46,121	69–43
113	August 11	@ Rangers	7–6	Wood (2–4)	Feliz (3–3)	Rivera (24)	48,676	70–43
114	August 12	@ Royals	4–3	Sabathia (15–5)	Chen (7–6)	Robertson (1)	23,337	71–43
115	August 13	@ Royals	3–4	Davies (6–7)	Moseley (2–2)	Soria (32)	30,680	71–44
116	August 14	@ Royals	8–3	Hughes (14–5)	O'Sullivan (1–4)		34,206	72–44
117	August 15	@ Royals	0–1	Bullington (1–2)	Burnett (9–10)	Soria (33)	26,012	72–45
118	August 16	Tigers	1–3	Scherzer (8–9)	Vázquez (9–9)	Valverde (23)	46,098	72–46
119	August 17	Tigers	6–2	Sabathia (16–5)	Verlander (13–8)		46,906	73–46
120	August 18	Tigers	9–5	Moseley (3–2)	Bonderman (6–9)		46,479	74–46
121	August 19	Tigers	11–5	Hughes (15–5)	Porcello (5–11)	Mitre (1)	48,143	75–46
122	August 20	Mariners	0–6	Hernández (9–10)	Burnett (9–11)		46,493	75–47
123	August 21	Mariners	9–5	Logan (1–0)	Vargas (9–6)	Rivera (25)	48,158	76–47
124	August 22	Mariners	10–0	Sabathia (17–5)	French (2–4)		46,778	77–47
125	August 23	@ Blue Jays	2–3	Downs (5–5)	Robertson (2–4)	Gregg (28)	29,198	77–48
126	August 24	@ Blue Jays	11–5	Moseley (4–2)	Rzepczynski (1–2)		30,567	78–48
127	August 25	@ Blue Jays	2–6	Cecil (11–6)	Hughes (15–6)	Gregg (29)	31,449	78–49
128	August 27	@ White Sox	4–9	García (11–5)	Burnett (9–12)		38,596	78–50
129	August 28	@ White Sox	12–9	Sabathia (18–5)	Danks (12–9)	Rivera (26)	38,811	79–50
130	August 29	@ White Sox	2–1	Nova (1–0)	Floyd (9–11)	Rivera (27)	39,433	80–50
131	August 30	Athletics	11–5	Vázquez (10–9)	Cahill (14–6)		46,356	81–50
132	August 31	Athletics	9–3	Hughes (16–6)	Mazzaro (6–7)		44,575	82–50

September (12–15)

#	Date	Opponent	Score	Win	Loss	Save	Attendance	Record
133	September 1	Athletics	4–3	Burnett (10–12)	Anderson (3–6)	Rivera (28)	45,222	83–50
134	September 2	Athletics	5–0	Sabathia (19–5)	Braden (9–10)		44,644	84–50
135	September 3	Blue Jays	7–3	Wood (3–4)	Morrow (10–7)		44,739	85–50
136	September 4	Blue Jays	7–5	Chamberlain (2–4)	Frasor (3–4)	Rivera (29)	47,478	86–50
137	September 5	Blue Jays	3–7	Cecil (12–7)	Hughes (16–7)		47,737	86–51
138	September 6	Orioles	3–4	Matusz (8–12)	Burnett (10–13)	Uehara (7)	46,103	86–52
139	September 7	Orioles	2–6	Arrieta (5–6)	Sabathia (19–6)		46,432	86–53
140	September 8	Orioles	3–2	Chamberlain (3–4)	Uehara (1–1)		44,163	87–53
141	September 10	@ Rangers	5–6 (13)	Feldman (7–10)	Gaudin (0–4)		46,179	87–54
142	September 11	@ Rangers	6–7	Ogando (4–1)	Rivera (3–3)		49,210	87–55
143	September 12	@ Rangers	1–4	Lee (11–8)	Moseley (4–3)	Feliz (36)	42,007	87–56
144	September 13	@ Rays	0–1 (11)	Balfour (2–1)	Mitre (0–3)		26,907	87–57
145	September 14	@ Rays	8–7 (10)	Robertson (3–4)	Wheeler (2–3)	Rivera (30)	28,713	88–57
146	September 15	@ Rays	3–4	Qualls (2–4)	Hughes (16–8)	Soriano (43)	29,733	88–58
147	September 17	@ Orioles	4–3	Robertson (4–4)	Uehara (1–2)	Rivera (31)	32,874	89–58
148	September 18	@ Orioles	11–3	Sabathia (20–6)	Guthrie (10–14)		48,775	90–58
149	September 19	@ Orioles	3–4 (11)	Gonzalez (1–3)	Robertson (4–5)		39,537	90–59
150	September 20	Rays	8–6	Gaudin (1–4)	Garza (14–9)	Rivera (32)	47,437	91–59
151	September 21	Rays	8–3	Hughes (17–8)	Shields (13–13)	Chamberlain (3)	46,609	92–59
152	September 22	Rays	2–7	Hellickson (4–0)	Burnett (10–14)		46,986	92–60
153	September 23	Rays	3–10	Price (18–6)	Sabathia (20–7)		47,646	92–61
154	September 24	Red Sox	8–10	Beckett (6–5)	Pettitte (11–3)	Papelbon (37)	49,457	92–62
155	September 25	Red Sox	3–7	Lester (19–8)	Nova (1–1)		49,558	92–63
156	September 26	Red Sox	4–3 (10)	Logan (2–0)	Okajima (4–4)		49,199	93–63
157	September 27	@ Blue Jays	5–7	Rzepczynski (3–4)	Burnett (10–15)	Gregg (36)	16,004	93–64
158	September 28	@ Blue Jays	6–1	Sabathia (21–6)	Drabek (0–2)		16,208	94–64
159	September 29	@ Blue Jays	4–8	Cecil (15–7)	Vázquez (10–10)		33,143	94–65

October (1–2)

#	Date	Opponent	Score	Win	Loss	Save	Attendance	Record
—	October 1	@ Red Sox	Postponed due to rain					
160	October 2	@ Red Sox	6–5 (10)	Hughes (18–8)	Papelbon (5–7)	Rivera (33)	37,467	95–65
161	October 2	@ Red Sox	6–7 (10)	Manuel (1–0)	Nova (1–2)		37,589	95–66
162	October 3	@ Red Sox	4–8	Lackey (14–11)	Moseley (4–4)		37,453	95–67

=== Postseason game log ===
Legend
Yankees Win	Yankees Loss	Game Postponed

2010 Postseason Game Log
ALDS vs Twins (Yankees win series 3–0)

#	Date	Opponent	Score	Win	Loss	Save	Attendance	Record
1	October 6	@ Twins	6–4	Sabathia (1–0)	Crain (0–1)	Rivera (1)	42,032	1–0
2	October 7	@ Twins	5–2	Pettitte (1–0)	Pavano (0–1)	Rivera (2)	42,035	2–0
3	October 9	Twins	6–1	Hughes (1–0)	Duensing (0–1)		50,840	3–0

ALCS vs Rangers (Yankees lose series 2–4)

#	Date	Opponent	Score	Win	Loss	Save	Attendance	Record
1	October 15	@ Rangers	6–5	Moseley (1–0)	O'Day (0–1)	Rivera (1)	50,930	1–0
2	October 16	@ Rangers	2–7	Lewis (1–0)	Hughes (0–1)		50,362	1–1
3	October 18	Rangers	0–8	Lee (1–0)	Pettitte (0–1)		49,480	1–2
4	October 19	Rangers	3–10	Holland (1–0)	Burnett (0–1)	Oliver (1)	49,977	1–3
5	October 20	Rangers	7–2	Sabathia (1–0)	Wilson (0–1)		49,832	2–3
6	October 22	@ Rangers	1–6	Lewis (2–0)	Hughes (0–2)		51,404	2–4

== Player stats ==
=== Batting ===
Note: G = Games played; AB = At bats; H = Hits; 2B = Doubles; 3B = Triples; HR = Home runs; RBI = Runs batted in; SB = Stolen bases; BB = Walks; AVG = Batting average; SLG = Slugging percentage

Player	G	AB	R	H	2B	3B	HR	RBI	SB	BB	AVG	SLG
Derek Jeter	157	663	111	179	30	3	10	67	18	63	.270	.370
Robinson Canó	160	626	103	200	41	3	29	109	3	57	.319	.534
Mark Teixeira	158	601	113	154	36	0	33	108	0	93	.256	.481
Nick Swisher	150	566	91	163	33	3	29	89	1	58	.288	.511
Alex Rodriguez	137	522	74	141	29	2	30	125	4	59	.270	.506
Brett Gardner	150	477	97	132	20	7	5	47	47	79	.277	.379
Curtis Granderson	136	466	76	115	17	7	24	67	12	53	.247	.468
Jorge Posada	120	383	49	95	23	1	18	57	3	59	.248	.454
Francisco Cervelli	93	266	27	72	11	3	0	38	1	33	.271	.335
Marcus Thames	82	212	22	61	7	0	12	33	0	19	.288	.491
Ramiro Peña	85	154	18	35	1	1	0	18	7	6	.227	.247
Lance Berkman	37	106	9	27	7	0	1	9	0	17	.255	.349
Austin Kearns	36	102	13	24	3	0	2	7	0	12	.235	.324
Nick Johnson	24	72	12	12	4	0	2	8	0	24	.167	.306
Juan Miranda	33	64	7	14	2	1	3	10	0	7	.219	.422
Randy Winn	29	61	7	13	0	1	1	8	1	8	.213	.295
Colin Curtis	31	59	7	11	3	0	1	8	0	4	.186	.288
Eduardo Núñez	30	50	12	14	1	0	1	7	5	3	.280	.360
Kevin Russo	31	49	5	9	2	0	0	4	1	3	.184	.224
Greg Golson	24	23	3	6	2	0	0	2	0	0	.261	.348
Chad Huffman	9	18	1	3	0	0	0	2	0	2	.167	.167
Chad Moeller	9	14	2	3	3	0	0	0	0	1	.214	.429
Pitcher totals	162	13	0	2	0	0	0	0	0	2	.154	.154
Team totals	162	5567	859	1485	275	32	201	823	103	662	.267	.436

=== Pitching ===
Note: W = Wins; L = Losses; ERA = Earned run average; G = Games pitched; GS = Games started; SV = Saves; IP = Innings pitched; H = Hits allowed; R = Runs allowed; ER = Earned runs allowed; BB = Walks allowed; SO = Strikeouts

Player	W	L	ERA	G	GS	SV	IP	H	R	ER	BB	SO
CC Sabathia	21	7	3.18	34	34	0	237.2	209	92	84	74	197
A.J. Burnett	10	15	5.26	33	33	0	186.2	204	118	109	78	145
Phil Hughes	18	8	4.19	31	29	0	176.1	162	83	82	58	146
Javier Vázquez	10	10	5.32	31	26	0	157.1	155	96	93	65	121
Andy Pettitte	11	3	3.28	21	21	0	129.0	123	52	47	41	101
Joba Chamberlain	3	4	4.40	73	0	3	71.2	71	37	35	22	77
Dustin Moseley	4	4	4.96	16	9	0	65.1	66	36	36	27	33
David Robertson	4	5	3.82	64	0	1	61.1	59	26	26	33	71
Mariano Rivera	3	3	1.80	61	0	33	60.0	39	14	12	11	45
Sergio Mitre	0	3	3.33	27	3	1	54.0	43	23	20	16	29
Chad Gaudin	1	2	4.50	30	0	0	48.0	46	27	24	20	33
Iván Nova	1	2	4.50	10	7	0	42.0	44	22	21	17	26
Boone Logan	2	0	2.93	51	0	0	40.0	34	13	13	20	38
Chan Ho Park	2	1	5.60	27	0	0	35.1	40	25	22	12	29
Kerry Wood	2	0	0.69	24	0	0	26.0	14	2	2	18	31
Dámaso Marte	0	0	4.08	30	0	0	17.2	10	8	8	11	12
Alfredo Aceves	3	0	3.00	10	0	1	12.0	10	5	4	4	2
Jonathan Albaladejo	0	0	3.97	10	0	0	11.1	9	5	5	8	8
Rómulo Sánchez	0	0	0.00	2	0	0	4.1	1	0	0	3	5
Mark Melancon	0	0	9.00	2	0	0	4.0	7	5	4	0	3
Royce Ring	0	0	15.43	5	0	0	2.1	3	4	4	2	2
Team totals	95	67	4.06	162	162	39	1442.1	1349	693	651	540	1154

== Farm system ==
Level	Team	League	Manager
AAA	Scranton/Wilkes-Barre Yankees	International League	Dave Miley
AA	Trenton Thunder	Eastern League	Tony Franklin
A	Tampa Yankees	Florida State League	Torre Tyson
A	Charleston RiverDogs	South Atlantic League	Greg Colbrunn
A-Short Season	Staten Island Yankees	New York–Penn League	Josh Paul and Jody Reed
Rookie	GCL Yankees	Gulf Coast League	Tom Slater

LEAGUE CHAMPIONS: Tampa
