= 2010 American League Championship Series =

41st edition of Major League Baseball's American League Championship Series

Team (Wins)	Managers	Season
Texas Rangers (4)	Ron Washington	90–72 (.556), GA: 9
New York Yankees (2)	Joe Girardi	95–67 (.586), GB: 1
- Dates: October 15–22
- MVP: Josh Hamilton (Texas)
- Umpires: Gerry Davis (crew chief), Brian Gorman, Ángel Hernández, Fieldin Culbreth, Jim Reynolds, and Tony Randazzo

Broadcast
- Television: TBS; MLB International
- TV announcers: Ernie Johnson Jr., Ron Darling, and John Smoltz (TBS); Gary Thorne and Rick Sutcliffe (MLB International)
- Radio: ESPN
- Radio announcers: Jon Miller and Joe Morgan
- ALDS: Texas Rangers over Tampa Bay Rays (3–2); New York Yankees over Minnesota Twins (3–0)

The 2010 American League Championship Series (ALCS) was the best-of-seven playoff series which pitted the third-seeded Texas Rangers against the fourth-seeded and defending World Series champion New York Yankees for the American League pennant. The Rangers won the 2010 ALCS and faced the National League champion San Francisco Giants in the 2010 World Series, the franchise's first ever appearance in the World Series, but would go on to lose to the Giants in five games. The series, the 41st in league history, began October 15 and ended on October 22. The Rangers had home field advantage in the series, as the wild-card team defers home field advantage in the LDS and LCS regardless of regular-season record.

The Rangers and Yankees had met in the postseason in each of the Rangers' three previous postseason appearances; the Yankees had won all previous meetings, 3–1 in the 1996 ALDS, and 3–0 in the 1998 and 1999 ALDS.

== Summary ==
=== Texas Rangers vs. New York Yankees ===
Texas won the series, 4–2.

Game	Date	Score	Location	Time	Attendance
1	October 15	New York Yankees – 6, Texas Rangers – 5	Rangers Ballpark in Arlington	3:50	50,930
2	October 16	New York Yankees – 2, Texas Rangers – 7	Rangers Ballpark in Arlington	3:52	50,362
3	October 18	Texas Rangers – 8, New York Yankees – 0	Yankee Stadium	3:18	49,480
4	October 19	Texas Rangers – 10, New York Yankees – 3	Yankee Stadium	4:05	49,977
5	October 20	Texas Rangers – 2, New York Yankees – 7	Yankee Stadium	3:48	49,832
6	October 22	New York Yankees – 1, Texas Rangers – 6	Rangers Ballpark in Arlington	2:57	51,404

== Game summaries ==
=== Game 1 ===
October 15, 2010 7:00 pm (CDT) at Rangers Ballpark in Arlington in Arlington, Texas 80 °F (27 °C), clear
Team	1	2	3	4	5	6	7	8	9	R	H	E
New York	0	0	0	0	0	0	1	5	0	6	10	1
Texas	3	0	0	2	0	0	0	0	0	5	7	1
WP: Dustin Moseley (1–0) LP: Darren O'Day (0–1) Sv: Mariano Rivera (1); Home runs: NYY: Robinson Canó (1); TEX: Josh Hamilton (1); Attendance: 50,930; Boxscore

The Yankees quickly fell behind as the Rangers got to their ace, CC Sabathia. In the first inning Josh Hamilton cracked a three-run home run to put Texas out in front. Michael Young added two more runs in the fourth with a double. Rangers starter C. J. Wilson had gone for seven strong innings, allowing only a single earned run, a solo homer by Robinson Canó.

In the eighth inning, New York left fielder Brett Gardner reached base on an infield single to lead off the top of the inning and scored on a double by Derek Jeter. Darren Oliver relieved Wilson and allowed back-to-back walks to Nick Swisher and Mark Teixeira to load the bases with nobody out for Alex Rodriguez. Rodriguez hit a two-RBI single, reducing the deficit to 5–4. Robinson Canó tied the game with a single and Marcus Thames followed with a single of his own to give the Yankees a 6–5 lead.

That lead would be enough, as Kerry Wood shut down the Rangers in the eighth and in the ninth Mariano Rivera secured his 42nd postseason save, his final postseason save of his career.

=== Game 2 ===
October 16, 2010 3:00 pm (CDT) at Rangers Ballpark in Arlington in Arlington, Texas 81 °F (27 °C), sunny
Team	1	2	3	4	5	6	7	8	9	R	H	E
New York	0	0	0	1	0	1	0	0	0	2	7	0
Texas	1	2	2	0	2	0	0	0	X	7	12	0
WP: Colby Lewis (1–0) LP: Phil Hughes (0–1); Home runs: NYY: Robinson Canó (2); TEX: David Murphy (1); Attendance: 50,362; Boxscore

Once again the Yankees starter, this time Phil Hughes, lasted only four innings. The Rangers' Elvis Andrus scored on a double steal in the bottom of the first inning. David Murphy's solo home run in the second and three straight two-out hits by Mitch Moreland, Elvis Andrus, and Michael Young made the score 3–0.

Nelson Cruz hit a lead-off double off the right field wall in the bottom of the third and advanced to third base on Ian Kinsler's sacrifice bunt. Murphy and Bengie Molina's consecutive doubles increased the lead to five.

Robinson Canó answered with a lead-off double off the center field wall in the top of the fourth. Canó advanced to third on a wild pitch. Colby Lewis struck out Nick Swisher and Jorge Posada, but surrendered an RBI single to Lance Berkman. Berkman's hard hit just passed first baseman Moreland's glove but Moreland recovered the ball and caught Berkman between first and second base.

Cruz hit another lead-off double in the bottom of the fifth and scored on Kinsler's RBI triple. Hughes was then relieved by Joba Chamberlain. Chamberlain struck out Murphy and Molina, but surrendered an RBI single to Moreland.

Canó hit a solo home run in the top of the sixth inning, but, despite having runners in scoring position the next three innings, the Yankees never scored again.

This was the Rangers' first postseason home game win, and it also snapped a 10-game losing streak to the Yankees in postseason dating back to Game 2 of the 1996 ALDS.

=== Game 3 ===
October 18, 2010 8:00 pm (EDT) at Yankee Stadium in Bronx, New York 55 °F (13 °C), overcast
Team	1	2	3	4	5	6	7	8	9	R	H	E
Texas	2	0	0	0	0	0	0	0	6	8	11	0
New York	0	0	0	0	0	0	0	0	0	0	2	0
WP: Cliff Lee (1–0) LP: Andy Pettitte (0–1); Home runs: TEX: Josh Hamilton (2); NYY: None; Attendance: 49,480; Boxscore

Rangers ace Cliff Lee continued his postseason dominance as he pitched eight scoreless innings on 122 pitches, striking out 13 while allowing only two hits and one walk. Josh Hamilton's two-run homer in the top of the first inning gave the Rangers an early lead which they never relinquished. After the Hamilton home run, Yankees starter Andy Pettitte threw 6 2/3 scoreless innings, while reliever Kerry Wood pitched a scoreless eighth inning.

The Rangers padded their lead in the top of the ninth inning. Hamilton hit a leadoff double off of Boone Logan, who was relieved by David Robertson. Back-to-back singles by Vladimir Guerrero and Nelson Cruz made it 3–0 Rangers. Robertson struck out Ian Kinsler on a wild pitch that let Cruz go to second. After David Murphy was intentionally walked, Bengie Molina's single scored a run, then Mitch Moreland's single scored two more, and Elvis Andrus's double made it 7–0 Rangers. Sergio Mitre relieved Robertson and threw a wild pitch that scored the last run of the inning. Rangers closer Neftalí Feliz, entering the game in a non-save situation, pitched a perfect bottom of the ninth inning to preserve the shutout.

The Yankees' offense was just 1-for-14 with RISP over the last two games. Derek Jeter's postseason streak of getting on base in 21 consecutive games was stopped, as he went 0-for-4 and was not walked. His first at-bat was a pop-fly; the second, third, and fourth at-bats were strike-outs. Lee's shutout was the first time that the Yankees had failed to score a run in a post-season game since being shut out by the Detroit Tigers on October 6, 2006. Lee became the first pitcher to strike out at least 10 in three consecutive playoff appearances, and took his postseason tally to 7–0.

=== Game 4 ===
October 19, 2010 8:00 pm (EDT) at Yankee Stadium in Bronx, New York 57 °F (14 °C), mostly clear
Team	1	2	3	4	5	6	7	8	9	R	H	E
Texas	0	0	2	0	0	3	2	0	3	10	13	0
New York	0	1	1	1	0	0	0	0	0	3	7	0
WP: Derek Holland (1–0) LP: A. J. Burnett (0–1) Sv: Darren Oliver (1); Home runs: TEX: Bengie Molina (1), Josh Hamilton 2 (4), Nelson Cruz (1); NYY: Robinson Canó (3); Attendance: 49,977; Boxscore

The Yankees jumped to an early lead in the bottom of the second on a controversial solo home run from Robinson Canó. Canó hit the ball over the right field wall and right-field umpire Jim Reynolds ruled the ball a home run, but Rangers right fielder Nelson Cruz argued that there was spectator interference. Television replays showed that the fans did not illegally interfere with the ball directly, but that a few fans did touch Cruz's glove while it was over the field of play. Instant replay review was not used and the home run call stood. Two batters later, Lance Berkman hit the ball deep to right field and was initially ruled a home run by Reynolds, but the umpires elected to use instant replay review and overturned the call to a foul ball; Berkman eventually struck out looking.

The Rangers took the lead in the top of the third. David Murphy led off the inning with a walk and Bengie Molina was hit by a pitch. A sacrifice bunt by Mitch Moreland followed by an RBI grounder from Elvis Andrus scored Murphy from third. Michael Young followed Andrus with an infield hit that drove in Molina.

In the bottom half of the third, Derek Jeter tripled and scored on a Curtis Granderson RBI single to tie the game at 2–2.

In the bottom of the fourth inning Alex Rodriguez was hit by a pitch, and Canó and Berkman each singled to load the bases. Nick Swisher struck out, and Rangers starting pitcher Tommy Hunter was replaced by Derek Holland. Brett Gardner hit a hard RBI grounder to shortstop Elvis Andrus, who forced Canó out at third but allowed Rodriguez to score, giving the Yankees a one-run lead.

In the top of the sixth inning, Vladimir Guerrero singled, but was forced out at second on a Cruz grounder that resulted in Cruz safely reaching first. Cruz then tagged up to second on Ian Kinsler's fly out. David Murphy was then intentionally walked to get to Bengie Molina. On the first pitch of the at bat, Molina hit a three-run home run to left field, giving the Rangers a 5–3 lead.

The Rangers piled onto their lead in the top of the seventh as Josh Hamilton hit a solo home run against Boone Logan. Guerrero then doubled, Cruz walked, and Kinsler hit a bloop single to right field to extend the lead to 7–3.

In the bottom of the eighth, Holland walked Granderson and was replaced with Darren O'Day. O'Day then walked Rodriguez and was replaced by Clay Rapada, who promptly walked Canó. Finally, Darren Oliver came in and got Swisher to pop up and Berkman to ground out.

In the top of the ninth, Hamilton hit another solo home run off Yankees reliever Sergio Mitre which tied the ALCS home run records. Guerrero followed up with an infield single. Cruz then homered to left to make the score 10–3.

In the bottom of the ninth, Gardner singled to lead off and took second base on defensive indifference. Posada grounded out allowing Gardner to advance to third base, but Jeter flew out and Granderson lined out to Moreland, stranding Gardner at third base and ending the game.

The Canó home run has been compared to the Jeffrey Maier play, according to many analysts. When asked about the Canó controversy, Maier replied, "it was pretty funny."

=== Game 5 ===
October 20, 2010 4:00 pm (EDT) at Yankee Stadium in Bronx, New York 60 °F (16 °C), overcast
Team	1	2	3	4	5	6	7	8	9	R	H	E
Texas	0	0	0	0	1	1	0	0	0	2	13	1
New York	0	3	2	0	1	0	0	1	X	7	9	0
WP: CC Sabathia (1–0) LP: C. J. Wilson (0–1); Home runs: TEX: Matt Treanor (1); NYY: Nick Swisher (1), Robinson Canó (4), Curtis Granderson (1); Attendance: 49,832; Boxscore

The Yankees struck in the bottom of the second as Alex Rodriguez walked. Marcus Thames popped out, then Lance Berkman walked. Jorge Posada then hit a RBI single for the first run of the game. Curtis Granderson followed with a single of his own, driving in another. Jeff Francoeur's error scored another, making the score 3–0.

The Yankees got two more runs as Nick Swisher and Robinson Canó hit back-to-back solo homers, extending the lead to five. Canó's homer was his fourth in the series. The homer also tied the ALCS home run records.

Sabathia gave up his first run in the top of the fifth as Matt Treanor homered. The Yankees responded in the bottom of the inning as Swisher walked and Canó lined out. Rodriguez then hit a double, followed by Berkman's sacrifice fly that scored Swisher.

In the top of the sixth, Vladimir Guerrero struck out. David Murphy, Ian Kinsler, and Francoeur hit consecutive singles. Treanor's grounder to third brought in the Rangers' second run, but Sabathia struck out Moreland to end the inning with runners on second and third. Curtis Granderson homered in the eighth to return the Yankees' lead to five.

Although Sabathia allowed a season-high 11 hits, he gave the Yankees six innings. Kerry Wood pitched two scoreless innings, and Mariano Rivera pitched the ninth inning to seal the win for the Yankees.

=== Game 6 ===
October 22, 2010 7:00 pm (CDT) at Rangers Ballpark in Arlington in Arlington, Texas 81 °F (27 °C), chance of rain
Team	1	2	3	4	5	6	7	8	9	R	H	E
New York	0	0	0	0	1	0	0	0	0	1	3	0
Texas	1	0	0	0	4	0	1	0	X	6	7	0
WP: Colby Lewis (2–0) LP: Phil Hughes (0–2); Home runs: NYY: None; TEX: Nelson Cruz (2); Attendance: 51,404; Boxscore

Elvis Andrus doubled to lead off the bottom of the first, advanced to third on a Josh Hamilton single and scored on an RBI groundout from Vladimir Guerrero. Texas starter Colby Lewis shut down the Yankees until the top of the fifth, when Alex Rodriguez doubled and later scored on a wild pitch that appeared to hit Nick Swisher.

In the bottom of that same inning, with Mitch Moreland on third and two outs, Yankees starter Phil Hughes intentionally walked Hamilton to face Guerrero. Guerrero doubled to score both Moreland and Hamilton. Hughes was then replaced by David Robertson, who promptly gave up a two-run home run to Nelson Cruz to give Texas a 5–1 lead. Ian Kinsler added a run on a sacrifice fly in the seventh inning off of Kerry Wood.

In the ninth, Neftalí Feliz closed out the series for Texas, striking out Alex Rodriguez to send the Rangers to the World Series for the first time in franchise history. One journalist wrote "Tom Hicks was right. Texas did win a pennant with A-Rod on the field."

=== Composite box ===
2010 ALCS (4–2): Texas Rangers over New York Yankees

Team	1	2	3	4	5	6	7	8	9	R	H	E
Texas Rangers	7	2	4	2	7	4	3	0	9	38	63	2
New York Yankees	0	4	3	2	2	1	1	6	0	19	38	1
Total attendance: 301,985 Average attendance: 50,330

== Broadcasting ==
TBS carried all the games with Ernie Johnson, Ron Darling and John Smoltz in the broadcast booth. For international viewers, MLB International broadcast all the games, with the broadcast team of Gary Thorne and Rick Sutcliffe announcing.
