= 2010 American League Division Series =

Teams
Team (Wins)		Manager	Season
Texas Rangers (3)		Ron Washington	90–72 (.556), GA: 9
Tampa Bay Rays (2)		Joe Maddon	96–66 (.593), GA: 1
- Dates: October 6–12
- Television: TBS
- TV announcers: Don Orsillo, Buck Martinez, and Marc Fien
- Radio: ESPN
- Radio announcers: Dan Shulman and Bobby Valentine
- Umpires: Tim Welke, Jim Wolf, Jerry Meals, Bill Miller, Jeff Kellogg, and Mike DiMuro

Teams
Team (Wins)		Manager	Season
New York Yankees (3)		Joe Girardi	95–67 (.586), GB: 1
Minnesota Twins (0)		Ron Gardenhire	94–68 (.580), GA: 6
- Dates: October 6–9
- Television: TBS
- TV announcers: Ernie Johnson, Ron Darling, and John Smoltz
- Radio: ESPN
- Radio announcers: Jon Miller and Orel Hershiser
- Umpires: Jerry Crawford, Hunter Wendelstedt, Greg Gibson, Brian O'Nora, Gary Darling, and Chris Guccione

The 2010 American League Division Series (ALDS) were two best-of-five playoff series in Major League Baseball’s (MLB) 2010 postseason to determine the participating teams in the 2010 American League Championship Series. The three divisional winners and a fourth "Wild Card" team (the team with the best record among teams not winning their division) played in two series from October 6 to 12. TBS televised all games in the United States.

Under MLB's playoff format, no two teams from the same division were matched up in the Division Series, regardless of whether their records would normally indicate such a matchup. Home field advantage went to the team with the better regular-season record with the exception of the wild card team, which defers home field advantage regardless of record. The matchups were:

- (1) Tampa Bay Rays (AL East champions) vs. (3) Texas Rangers (AL West champions): Rangers won the series, 3–2.
- (2) Minnesota Twins (AL Central champions) vs. (4) New York Yankees (Wild Card qualifier): Yankees won the series, 3–0.

This was the second consecutive season and fourth season overall in which the Twins and Yankees met in the ALDS; the Yankees won all their previous series, 3–1 in 2003 and 2004, and 3–0 in 2009. The Rays and Rangers had never met previously in the postseason, with Tampa Bay making only their second postseason appearance in franchise history (after 2008) and Texas making their fourth appearance (and first since 1999).

The Rangers' win was the first postseason series victory in franchise history; the series also became the first MLB postseason series in which the visiting team won every game. On the other side, the Yankees extended their postseason dominance over the Twins to four consecutive series wins.

The Rangers went on to defeat the Yankees in the ALCS, then lose the 2010 World Series to the National League champion San Francisco Giants.

== Matchups ==
=== Tampa Bay Rays vs. Texas Rangers ===
Texas won the series, 3–2.

Game	Date	Score	Location	Time	Attendance
1	October 6	Texas Rangers – 5, Tampa Bay Rays – 1	Tropicana Field	3:06	35,474
2	October 7	Texas Rangers – 6, Tampa Bay Rays – 0	Tropicana Field	3:10	35,535
3	October 9	Tampa Bay Rays – 6, Texas Rangers – 3	Rangers Ballpark in Arlington	3:38	51,746
4	October 10	Tampa Bay Rays – 5, Texas Rangers – 2	Rangers Ballpark in Arlington	3:22	49,218
5	October 12	Texas Rangers – 5, Tampa Bay Rays – 1	Tropicana Field	3:00	41,845

=== Minnesota Twins vs. New York Yankees ===
New York won the series, 3–0.

Game	Date	Score	Location	Time	Attendance
1	October 6	New York Yankees – 6, Minnesota Twins – 4	Target Field	3:47	42,032
2	October 7	New York Yankees – 5, Minnesota Twins – 2	Target Field	2:59	42,035
3	October 9	Minnesota Twins – 1, New York Yankees – 6	Yankee Stadium	3:06	50,840

== Tampa Bay vs. Texas ==
=== Game 1 ===
October 6, 2010 1:30 pm (EDT) at Tropicana Field in St. Petersburg, Florida 73 °F (23 °C), dome
Team	1	2	3	4	5	6	7	8	9	R	H	E
Texas	0	2	1	1	1	0	0	0	0	5	10	1
Tampa Bay	0	0	0	0	0	0	1	0	0	1	6	2
WP: Cliff Lee (1–0) LP: David Price (0–1); Home runs: TEX: Nelson Cruz (1) Bengie Molina (1); TB: Ben Zobrist (1); Attendance: 35,474; Boxscore

Rangers ace Cliff Lee dominated the American League East champions in Game 1. He struck out ten while allowing five hits. During one stretch, he retired 16 of 17 batters before giving up a home run to Ben Zobrist in the seventh. The win also snapped a nine-game postseason losing streak that began in 1996 for the Rangers.

Longtime Ranger Michael Young appeared in his first playoff game after playing in 1,508 games in his career. Only Randy Winn has played more games (1,717) without getting a shot in the postseason. Young was 0-for-4.

The Rangers got on the board in the second off of Rays ace David Price when Ian Kinsler hit a leadoff single and scored on Jeff Francoeur's double. After a strikeout, Francoeur scored on Bengie Molina's single. Nelson Cruz and Molina hit home runs in the third and fourth respectively and Vladimir Guerrero hit an RBI double in the fifth. In the ninth inning, pitching in a non-save situation, Rangers closer Neftalí Feliz walked the first two batters, but then settled down and induced a lineout from Ben Zobrist before striking out Reid Brignac and Matt Joyce to end the game.

=== Game 2 ===
October 7, 2010 2:30 pm (EDT) at Tropicana Field in St. Petersburg, Florida 73 °F (23 °C), dome
Team	1	2	3	4	5	6	7	8	9	R	H	E
Texas	0	0	1	1	4	0	0	0	0	6	9	1
Tampa Bay	0	0	0	0	0	0	0	0	0	0	2	1
WP: C. J. Wilson (1–0) LP: James Shields (0–1); Home runs: TEX: Ian Kinsler (1), Michael Young (1); TB: None; Attendance: 35,535; Boxscore

The Rays still had no answers for both the Rangers' starting pitching and their offense. Matt Treanor was hit by a pitch, and eventually scored on Shields' pickoff error to first base in the third. Ian Kinsler hit a homer in the fourth to make it 2–0.

In the top of the fifth inning, with one out and Julio Borbon on base, Elvis Andrus hit a single. Shields was pulled, replaced by Chad Qualls. After a controversial checked swing call, Michael Young hit a three-run home run to extend the lead to 5–0. Rays manager Joe Maddon was ejected after arguing that Young's prior swing on the 2–2 pitch should have been called strike three. Ian Kinsler's RBI single later in the same inning made it 6–0 Rangers.

The Rays had their best chances in the bottom of the seventh inning. Ben Zobrist walked then advanced to third base on Willy Aybar's double. However, Kelly Shoppach and Matt Joyce both struck out, then Jason Bartlett hit a fly ball to center field to end the threat.

C. J. Wilson pitched 6 1/3 shutout innings for Texas, giving up two hits and striking out seven while walking two.

=== Game 3 ===
October 9, 2010 4:00 pm (CDT) at Rangers Ballpark in Arlington in Arlington, Texas 85 °F (29 °C), sunny
Team	1	2	3	4	5	6	7	8	9	R	H	E
Tampa Bay	0	0	0	0	0	1	0	2	3	6	11	0
Texas	0	0	1	0	0	0	1	0	1	3	6	0
WP: Joaquín Benoit (1–0) LP: Darren Oliver (0–1); Home runs: TB: Carl Crawford (1), Carlos Peña (1); TEX: Ian Kinsler (2), Nelson Cruz (2); Attendance: 51,746; Boxscore

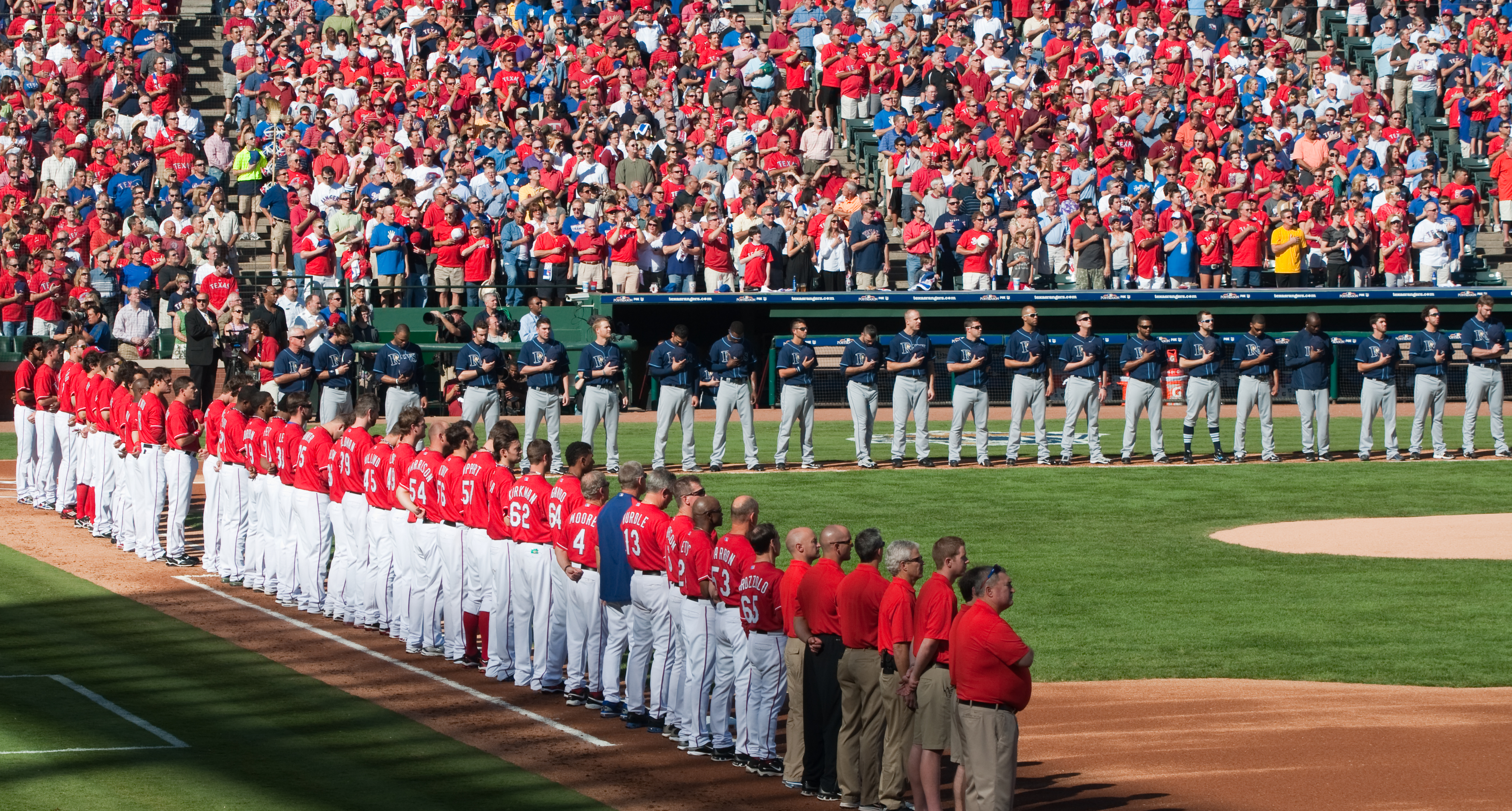
Players during the national anthem preceding game 3

In seeking their first franchise postseason home game win and series sweep, the Rangers sent Colby Lewis to the mound to face the Rays' Matt Garza. The Rays were counting on the 2008 ALCS MVP to come through once again and prevent a sweep.

The Rangers struck first in the bottom of the third inning. Mitch Moreland hit a lead-off double in the bottom of the third inning, advanced to third on a passed ball by Rays catcher John Jaso, then scored on Elvis Andrus's RBI ground-out.

After being shut down for 16 consecutive innings in this series, the Rays finally came back to life. After walking Evan Longoria, Lewis was replaced by reliever Derek Holland. The next hitter Matt Joyce hit a ground ball to Rangers second baseman Ian Kinsler. Longoria was out at second base, but Joyce was ruled safe at first on a close play. Dan Johnson singled, but Joyce was tagged out at second base after a failed attempt to advance to third. Holland was replaced by Alexi Ogando after walking Carlos Peña. Orgando gave up an RBI double to B. J. Upton that scored Johnson. The game was tied at 1–1.

Another controversial play occurred in the bottom of the sixth inning when Andrus stole second on Josh Hamilton's strikeout. Garza and Maddon argued with the second base umpire Jeff Kellogg that Andrus' right leg did not stay on base.

Ian Kinsler's go-ahead homer in the bottom of the seventh inning took the lead for the Rangers and also knocked Garza out of the game.

Rays designated hitter Dan Johnson doubled in the top of the eighth inning, then Peña's RBI single scored pinch-runner Desmond Jennings to tie the game at 2–2. Later, John Jaso hit a two-out RBI single that scored Peña. This was the Rays' first lead in the series.

Carl Crawford led off the top of the ninth inning with a home run. Later, Peña's two-run homer increased Rays' lead to four, which was enough for Rays closer Rafael Soriano, despite a home run by Nelson Cruz in the bottom of the ninth inning.

=== Game 4 ===
October 10, 2010 12:00 pm (CDT) at Rangers Ballpark in Arlington in Arlington, Texas 80 °F (27 °C), sunny
Team	1	2	3	4	5	6	7	8	9	R	H	E
Tampa Bay	0	1	0	2	2	0	0	0	0	5	12	0
Texas	0	0	0	0	0	2	0	0	0	2	8	2
WP: Wade Davis (1–0) LP: Tommy Hunter (0–1) Sv: Rafael Soriano (1); Home runs: TB: Evan Longoria (1); TEX: Nelson Cruz (3); Attendance: 49,218; Boxscore

Neal McCoy performs the national anthem prior to the game.

The Rays scored first in the top of the second inning. Carlos Peña hit a triple that bounced over the head of Rangers center fielder Josh Hamilton, then scored on Rangers second baseman Ian Kinsler's fielding error.

Back-to-back doubles by Evan Longoria and Peña in the top of the fourth inning brought in another run for the Rays. After two strikeouts, B. J. Upton hit the third double in this inning to score Peña.

Evan Longoria hit a two-run homer off Rangers reliever Derek Holland in the fifth inning to increase the Rays' lead to five.

The Rangers showed some sign of life when Nelson Cruz hit a home run, his third in this series, in the bottom of the sixth inning. Later Mitch Moreland's RBI double off Grant Balfour scored Ian Kinsler to make the score 5–2. After that, the Rays bullpen was excellent. Balfour got out of the inning and pitched a scoreless seventh, before handing it over to setup man Joaquín Benoit, a Ranger until this year. He worked a perfect eighth to pick up the hold.

Rays closer Rafael Soriano then pitched a perfect ninth for the save.

The series was tied at two and the Rangers were unable to notch their first postseason home game win. It marked the first time since 2005 that a Division Series in either league went the full five games.

=== Game 5 ===
October 12, 2010 8:00 pm (EDT) at Tropicana Field in St. Petersburg, Florida 73 °F (23 °C), dome
Team	1	2	3	4	5	6	7	8	9	R	H	E
Texas	1	0	0	1	0	1	0	0	2	5	11	1
Tampa Bay	0	0	1	0	0	0	0	0	0	1	6	2
WP: Cliff Lee (2–0) LP: David Price (0–2); Home runs: TEX: Ian Kinsler (3); TB: None; Attendance: 41,845; Boxscore

Game 5 featured a rematch of Game 1's two aces, the Rangers' Cliff Lee versus the Rays' David Price.

Elvis Andrus led off the game with a single, later stole second, and scored for the Rangers on Josh Hamilton's RBI ground-out in the top of the first inning. Rays' pitcher David Price was covering first on the play and was unaware of the runner rounding third. The Rays tied up the game in the bottom of the third inning when Sean Rodriguez scored on Ben Zobrist's RBI single.

In the top of the fourth inning, Nelson Cruz hit a two-out double that barely missed being a home run in the deepest corner of the field, stole third, then scored on Rays' catcher Kelly Shoppach's throwing error.

The Rangers got another run in the top of the sixth on a similar play to the one that occurred in the first. Ian Kinsler grounded the ball to first and the Rays attempted to turn a double play, with Price covering first. Once again, Price seemed to forget about the runner coming from second when he turned to the umpire to see the call. Vladimir Guerrero barely beat Price's throw to the plate and the Rangers led, 3–1. All three Texas runs in the game to this point had been scored due to some sort of defensive miscue. Price was relieved by Grant Balfour in the seventh inning, having gone six innings, allowing three runs (all earned) on eight hits, a slightly better line than his first game but not good enough to match Cliff Lee. Lee dominated the Rays through nine innings, allowing one earned run on six hits, with 11 strikeouts.

The Rangers got another two runs in the top of the ninth on Kinsler's two-run homer off Rays closer Rafael Soriano. Cruz had singled before the homer, one of his three hits. Kinsler also had three hits for Texas.

Lee's complete game gem made this series the first MLB postseason series in which the visiting team won every game, and his 21 strikeouts in the two games combined set an ALDS record for most strikeouts in a series. Lee finished the series with a 1.13 ERA in the two games. It was the first playoff series the Texas Rangers had ever won after losing their first three Division Series appearances in 1996, 1998, and 1999 (all to the New York Yankees).

=== Composite line score ===
2010 ALDS (3–2): Texas Rangers over Tampa Bay Rays

Team	1	2	3	4	5	6	7	8	9	R	H	E
Texas Rangers	1	2	3	3	5	3	1	0	3	21	44	5
Tampa Bay Rays	0	1	1	2	2	1	1	2	3	13	37	5
Total attendance: 213,818 Average attendance: 42,764

== Minnesota vs. New York ==
=== Game 1 ===
October 6, 2010 7:30 pm (CDT) at Target Field in Minneapolis, Minnesota 62 °F (17 °C), mostly clear
Team	1	2	3	4	5	6	7	8	9	R	H	E
New York	0	0	0	0	0	4	2	0	0	6	9	0
Minnesota	0	2	1	0	0	1	0	0	0	4	8	0
WP: CC Sabathia (1–0) LP: Jesse Crain (0–1) Sv: Mariano Rivera (1); Home runs: NYY: Mark Teixeira (1); MIN: Michael Cuddyer (1); Attendance: 42,032; Boxscore

Hoping to break their streak of postseason defeats against the Yankees, the Twins struck first in this first postseason game in Target Field. In the bottom of the second inning, Yankee starter CC Sabathia hit the leadoff hitter, Jim Thome, then allowed a two-run home run by Michael Cuddyer. Orlando Hudson scored on Jorge Posada's passed ball to make it 3–0 in the bottom of the third inning.

Francisco Liriano held the Yankees scoreless until the top of the sixth inning. Following Robinson Canó's and Jorge Posada's RBI singles, Curtis Granderson's RBI triple scored both Canó and Posada, made it 4–3 Yankees, and knocked Liriano out of the game.

In the bottom of the sixth inning, Danny Valencia's walk tied the game at 4–4.

The Yankees took the lead again in the top of the seventh inning as Mark Teixeira hit a two-run homer to right field. Yankees closer Mariano Rivera's four-out save (his 40th career postseason save) sealed the Game 1 win.

=== Game 2 ===
October 7, 2010 5:00 pm (CDT) at Target Field in Minneapolis, Minnesota 71 °F (22 °C), sunny
Team	1	2	3	4	5	6	7	8	9	R	H	E
New York	0	0	0	1	1	0	2	0	1	5	12	0
Minnesota	0	1	0	0	0	1	0	0	0	2	6	0
WP: Andy Pettitte (1–0) LP: Carl Pavano (0–1) Sv: Mariano Rivera (2); Home runs: NYY: Lance Berkman (1); MIN: Orlando Hudson (1); Attendance: 42,035; Boxscore

In Game 2, 17-game winner Carl Pavano started for the Twins, hoping to even the series. Pavano faced Yankee veteran Andy Pettitte. Like in Game 1, the Twins struck first in the second inning when Delmon Young scored on a Danny Valencia sacrifice fly.

The Yankees tied the game in the top of the fourth inning, as Curtis Granderson doubled, advanced to third base on Mark Teixeira's single, then scored on Alex Rodriguez's sacrifice fly.

Designated hitter Lance Berkman homered in the fifth inning to take the lead for the Yankees. However, Orlando Hudson tied it with a homer in the bottom of the sixth inning.

In the top of the seventh inning, Berkman's RBI double over the head of Twins center fielder Denard Span once again took the lead for the Yankees. Like Joe Maddon did earlier in the Rangers–Rays game, Twins manager Ron Gardenhire argued about the 1–2 borderline pitch right before Berkman's double and got ejected. Later, Derek Jeter's RBI single scored Berkman and made the score 4–2.

Granderson's RBI single scored Brett Gardner in the top of the ninth inning. In the bottom of the ninth inning, Mariano Rivera gave up a leadoff single to Joe Mauer, but got Delmon Young to ground into a double play and then induced a fly ball to left field from Jim Thome for the second consecutive save in the series.

This was Andy Pettitte's 19th career and final postseason win and Mariano Rivera's 41st postseason save; both are all-time postseason pitching records. Also, this was the 11th straight postseason loss for the Twins and eighth straight postseason loss against the Yankees.

=== Game 3 ===
October 9, 2010 8:30 pm (EDT) at Yankee Stadium in Bronx, New York 64 °F (18 °C), clear
Team	1	2	3	4	5	6	7	8	9	R	H	E
Minnesota	0	0	0	0	0	0	0	1	0	1	7	1
New York	0	1	1	3	0	0	1	0	X	6	12	0
WP: Phil Hughes (1–0) LP: Brian Duensing (0–1); Home runs: MIN: None; NYY: Marcus Thames (1), Nick Swisher (1); Attendance: 50,840; Boxscore

The Yankees took an early lead this time in the bottom of the second inning when Robinson Canó hit a lead-off triple, later scored on Jorge Posada's RBI single. Nick Swisher hit a two-out double in the bottom of the third inning, then scored on Mark Teixeira's RBI single to increase their lead to two.

Canó singled again in the bottom of the fourth inning. The next batter, Marcus Thames, who had a successful record against left-hander Brian Duensing this year, hit the first pitch he saw into right field. Later, Curtis Granderson walked, stole second, and advanced to third on Joe Mauer's throwing error. Brett Gardner's RBI sacrifice fly scored Granderson to make the score 5–0. Nick Swisher's homer in the bottom of the seventh inning increased the lead to six.

After being shut down by Hughes for seven innings, the Twins finally got on board in the top of the eighth inning. Danny Valencia hit a lead-off double off Yankees reliever Kerry Wood. After J. J. Hardy flew out, both Denard Span and Orlando Hudson singled to score Valencia. Wood was removed from the game after walking Mauer. However, Yankees relievers Boone Logan and David Robertson induced a popout and a flyout respectively to get out of the one-out bases-loaded jam. Yankees closer Mariano Rivera pitched a scoreless ninth for the series sweep.

This was the first time that the Yankees advanced to the ALCS as the Wild Card (they lost all three in 1995, 1997, and 2007), and this win marked the ninth time the Yankees advanced to the LCS since 1995, the most in MLB. The Minnesota Twins, with this loss, extended their postseason losing streak to 12 games, with nine of those coming against the Yankees.

=== Composite line score ===
2010 ALDS (3–0): New York Yankees over Minnesota Twins

Team	1	2	3	4	5	6	7	8	9	R	H	E
New York Yankees	0	1	1	4	1	4	5	0	1	17	33	0
Minnesota Twins	0	3	1	0	0	2	0	1	0	7	21	1
Total attendance: 134,907 Average attendance: 44,969

== See also ==
- 2010 National League Division Series
