= Sergio Mitre =

American baseball player (born 1981)

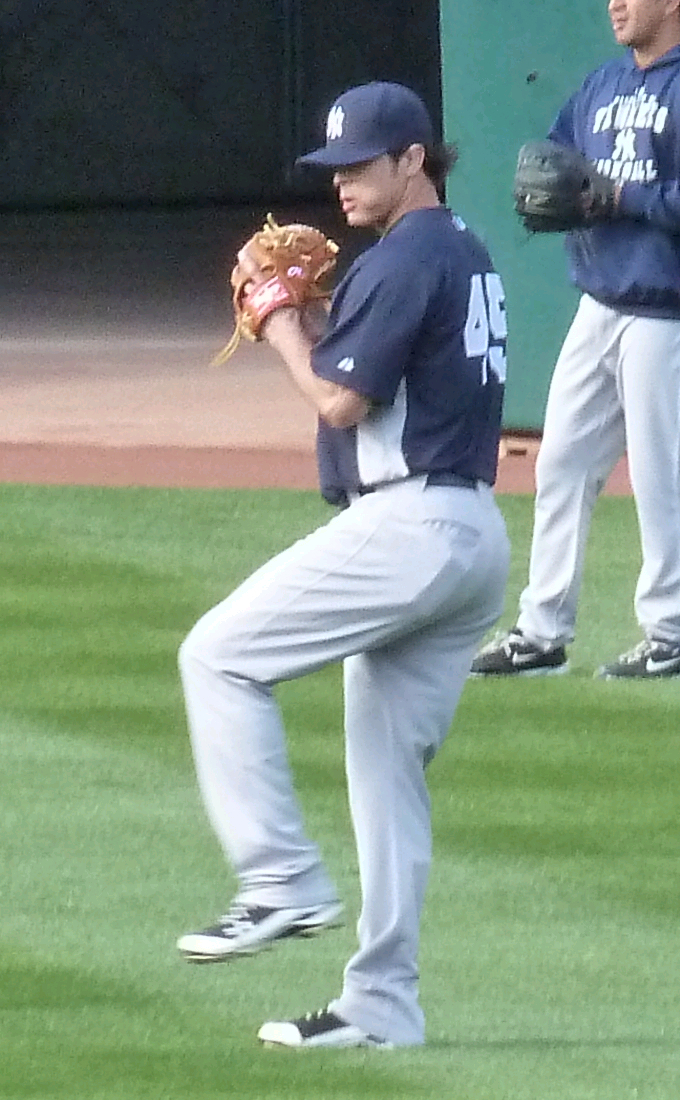
- Mitre with the New York Yankees
- Pitcher
- Born: February 16, 1981 (age 45); Los Angeles, California, U.S.
- Batted: Right Threw: Right

MLB debut
- July 22, 2003, for the Chicago Cubs

Last MLB appearance
- July 15, 2011, for the New York Yankees

MLB statistics
- Win–loss record: 13–30
- Earned run average: 5.21
- Strikeouts: 265
- Stats at Baseball Reference

Teams
- Chicago Cubs (2003–2005); Florida Marlins (2006–2007); New York Yankees (2009–2010); Milwaukee Brewers (2011); New York Yankees (2011)
Criminal information
Status	Incarcerated at Saltillo Prison in Saltillo, Mexico
Conviction	Femicide involving the murder of an infant child
Penalty	50 years in prison

Sergio Armando Mitre (born February 16, 1981) is a Mexican-American former professional baseball pitcher. He played in Major League Baseball (MLB) for the Chicago Cubs, Florida Marlins, Milwaukee Brewers, and New York Yankees. In 2022, he was sentenced to 50 years in prison by Mexican authorities for the murder of his then-girlfriend's 22-month-old daughter.

== Early life ==
Mitre is of Mexican American descent. He grew up in Tijuana, Mexico, where he trained in the arts of kenpo, boxing, and wrestling due to frequent street fights.

Mitre was a starting pitcher during his amateur career. He graduated from Montgomery High School in San Diego, California in 1999. He then attended San Diego City College.

== Professional career ==
=== Chicago Cubs ===
Mitre was the Chicago Cubs' 7th-round selection in the 2001 Major League Baseball draft out of San Diego City College. He was the second player out of the 2001 draft to make it to the majors with the Cubs, the first being Mark Prior. His first stop through the minors was the Boise Hawks in the Short Season Northwest League, where he pitched alongside Dontrelle Willis. In 2002, he played for the Lansing Lugnuts in the Class-A Midwest League, pitching to a 2.83 ERA in 168.2 innings.

He started the 2003 season in Double-A with the West Tennessee Diamond Jaxx, compiling a 6–7 record with a 3.79 ERA in 18 starts. Mitre led the team in innings pitched (109.1) and strikeouts (98). He was promoted to the majors on July 22 in order to start in place of the injured Prior. He allowed eight runs on 10 hits in just 3.2 innings that day and was optioned back to the minors. He made two more appearances that year for the Cubs, including a spot start on the last day of the season.

In 2004, Mitre started out the season on the Opening Day roster, filling in for the injured Mark Prior. He pitched to a 6.51 ERA through nine starts before being sent down to the Triple-A Iowa Cubs after Prior came back from injury. On August 13, 2004, Mitre pitched a complete game shutout against the Albuquerque Isotopes. He allowed a double and a walk in the first inning of the game, then sat down 23 straight batters, striking out nine. For his effort, Mitre was named the Pacific Coast League's Player of the Week. He returned to the majors in September and pitched out of the bullpen, finishing the season with a 2–4 record and 6.62 ERA in 12 games.

Mitre began the 2005 season in Triple-A. Mitre returned to the majors on May 24 to make a spot start when Kerry Wood was placed on the disabled list. He had two strong starts during his stint in the rotation. On June 8, Mitre out-pitched Roy Halladay in a 2–0 win over the Toronto Blue Jays, allowing two hits and a walk, while striking out six in seven innings. On June 14, 2005, he threw a five-hit complete game shutout in a 14–0 victory over the Florida Marlins and Josh Beckett. However, he was removed from the rotation after pitching to a 5.19 ERA in seven starts. Mitre pitched another 17 innings out of the bullpen for the Cubs that season, allowing 11 runs on 20 hits.

=== Florida Marlins ===
On December 7, 2005, Mitre and minor league pitchers Ricky Nolasco and Renyel Pinto were traded to the Florida Marlins for Juan Pierre. He started the 2006 season in the Marlins rotation, pitching to a 4.89 ERA in seven starts. On May 12, he threw just three pitches before leaving the game with shoulder discomfort. Mitre was placed on the 15-day disabled list with shoulder inflammation. He was later moved to the 60-day DL, and stayed there through August. After returning to pitch out of the bullpen, he experienced more inflammation eight games later and was shut down once again.

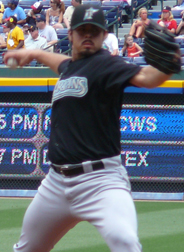
Mitre in 2007.

He started the 2007 season in the Marlins rotation, setting career bests in games played (27), starts (27), innings (149), and strikeouts (80). From May 20 to June 15, Mitre did not allow an earned run over 24.2 consecutive innings. He missed time with a blister in April and a sore hamstring in June.

Mitre started the 2008 season on the disabled list with a forearm strain. He initially attempted to rehab the injury, but ultimately underwent Tommy John ligament replacement surgery on July 15 and was expected to miss 12–18 months. The Marlins decided to release him at the end of the season.

=== New York Yankees ===
On November 3, Mitre signed a one-year minor league contract with the New York Yankees with an option for 2010. Mitre was suspended for the first 50 games of the 2009 season after testing positive for androstenedione in August 2008. Mitre said the androstenedione came from a contaminated legal supplement purchased from GNC, but took full responsibility for his actions. He served his suspension while still on the disabled list from last year's Tommy John surgery. Mitre pitched to a 2.40 ERA in seven starts for the Scranton/Wilkes-Barre Yankees in Triple-A before he was called up to start against the Baltimore Orioles on July 21. In total, he had a 6.79 ERA across 12 appearances (nine starts) that season. The Yankees declined their option on him after the season.

In January 2010, the Yankees re-signed him to a deal that avoided arbitration. He hit the disabled list with an oblique strain on June 5 and didn't return until July 24 when he started in place of the injured Andy Pettitte. That day, he allowed five runs on seven hits in 4.1 innings against the Kansas City Royals and was relieved by Dustin Moseley, who pitched 4.2 scoreless innings. For the next turn in the rotation, the Yankees used Moseley as a starter and Mitre was moved to the bullpen. He recorded his first career save on August 19, pitching the last three innings of a 11–5 win over the Detroit Tigers. Mitre pitched well out of the bullpen, compiling a 2.55 ERA in 24.2 innings, and was added to the Yankees postseason roster. His only playing time came during the American League Championship Series against the Texas Rangers, when he made three appearances in mop-up duty. He allowed home runs to Josh Hamilton and Nelson Cruz in the 9th inning of Game 4.

=== Milwaukee Brewers ===
On March 25, 2011, Mitre was traded to the Milwaukee Brewers for Chris Dickerson. He was designated for assignment on June 27, after posting a 3.27 ERA in 33 innings.

=== New York Yankees (second stint) ===
On June 29, 2011, Mitre was traded back to the New York Yankees in exchange for cash considerations. On July 19, he was placed on the 15-day disabled list with inflammation in his right shoulder. In four games with the Yankees, he posted an 11.81 ERA. He became a free agent following the season on October 30.

=== Tohoku Rakuten Golden Eagles ===
Mitre dealt with multiple injuries, including nerve damage in his back, that brought his MLB career to an end. In 2014, Mitre signed with the Rakuten Golden Eagles of Nippon Professional Baseball. He became a free agent following the season without appearing in a game for the team.

=== Bravos de León ===
On April 29, 2017, Mitre came out of retirement and signed with the Bravos de León of the Mexican Baseball League. In 4 starts 23 innings he went 2-1 with a 2.74 ERA and 13 strikeouts.

=== Toros de Tijuana ===
On July 9, 2017, Mitre was traded to the Toros de Tijuana in 5 games (4 starts) 29.1 innings he went 3-2 with a 3.38 ERA and 11 strikeouts. He was the team's opening day starter in 2018. He was released from the organization on July 26, 2018, after appearing in 3 games (1 start) 5 innings he went 0-0 with a 5.40 ERA and 5 strikeouts.

=== Team Mexico ===
He played for Team Mexico in the 2018 Caribbean Series, collecting six hits in Mexico's 8–1 victory over the Dominican Republic.

=== Tecolotes de los Dos Laredos ===
On April 3, 2019, Mitre signed with the Tecolotes de los Dos Laredos of the Mexican League. He was released on May 9. In 6 starts 29.1 innings he went 3-2 with a 7.36 ERA and 20 strikeouts.

=== Saraperos de Saltillo ===
On May 14, 2019, Mitre signed with the Saraperos de Saltillo of the Mexican League. In 14 games (13 starts) he threw 74 innings going 9-3 with a 5.59 ERA and 43 strikeouts.

== Personal life ==
He has a son named Sam (Sergio Armando Mitre III), who was born in 2006, and a daughter named Senya, who was born in 2009.

Mitre started Playmakers, a free youth baseball clinic for children in Chula Vista and National City.

== Murder conviction ==
=== 2019 domestic violence arrest ===
On September 1, 2019, while playing for the Saraperos de Saltillo of the Mexican League, Mitre was arrested on suspicion of assaulting a woman, after employees at a Quality Inn in Saltillo alerted authorities of a domestic violence situation taking place inside a suite. Following his arrest, the Saraperos owner denounced Mitre's actions, and he was later suspended indefinitely by the team. Mitre avoided jail time by paying a fine of 20,000 pesos.

=== 2020 murder ===
On July 13, 2020, Mitre was arrested in Saltillo for possession of marijuana. On July 14, Mitre was charged with femicide and aggravated statutory rape over the death and possible sexual assault of his girlfriend's daughter; he was booked into the Saltillo Prison. After the charges were announced, Mitre was released by the Saraperos and suspended indefinitely by the Mexican League. The statutory rape charges were later dropped after evidence showed the girl was not sexually assaulted.

On January 20, 2022, Mitre was sentenced to 50 years in prison after being convicted in Mexico for femicide in the murder of his then-girlfriend's 22-month-old daughter. He was also ordered to issue a public apology, and pay a MX$1,379,500 (USD $79,587.84) penalty for damages caused by his actions. Following the sentencing, Mitre's lawyers announced he would be appealing the conviction.
