= Kevin Russo =

American baseball player (born 1984)

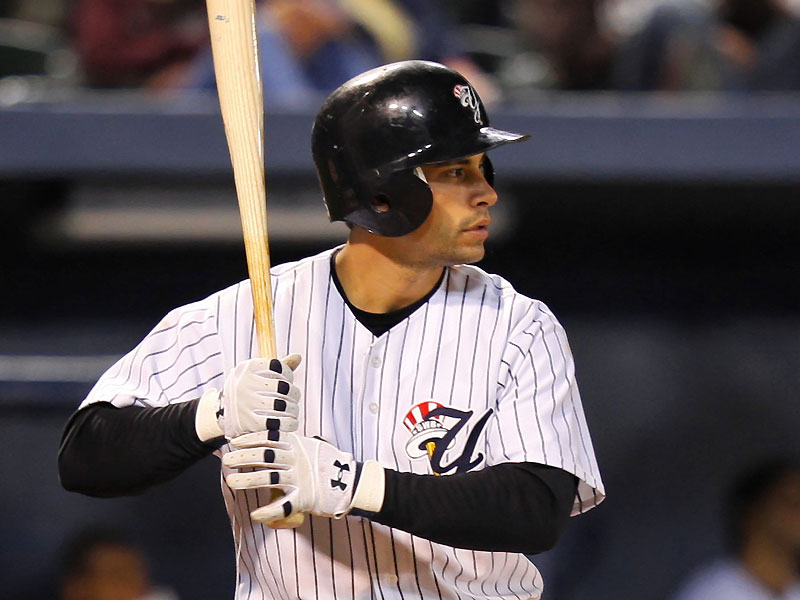
- Third baseman/Left fielder
- Born: July 8, 1984 (age 42); West Babylon, New York, U.S.
- Batted: Right Threw: Right

MLB debut
- May 8, 2010, for the New York Yankees

Last MLB appearance
- September 23, 2010, for the New York Yankees

MLB statistics
- Batting average: .184
- Home runs: 0
- Runs batted in: 4
- Stats at Baseball Reference

Teams
- New York Yankees (2010)

Kevin Alexander Russo (born July 8, 1984) is a former professional baseball player. He played in Major League Baseball (MLB) for the New York Yankees in 2010.

== Early years ==
Russo attended Fairview High School in Boulder, Colorado. As a running back on the Fairview High School football team, Russo rushed for 2,416 yards during his senior year, leading the team to a state title. He and LenDale White were named as the two all-state running backs by the Rocky Mountain News.

He attended San Jacinto College before transferring to Baylor University. At Baylor, he helped the Baylor Bears baseball team reach the 2005 College World Series. In 2005, he played collegiate summer baseball with the Wareham Gatemen of the Cape Cod Baseball League.

== Professional career ==
=== New York Yankees ===
Russo was drafted by the Yankees in the 20th round (614th overall) of the 2006 Major League Baseball draft. In 2007, he was a Mid-Season All-Star with the Tampa Yankees. In 2009, he was named an International League All-Star and a Triple-A All-Star.

Following the 2009 season, Russo was added to the 40-man roster to protect him from the Rule 5 draft. He was called up to the major leagues for the first time on May 8, 2010. He recorded his first hit in the Majors on May 21, 2010, in an interleague game against the New York Mets and added the decisive two-run double later in the game to lead the Yankees to a 2–1 win over the Mets.

The Yankees designated him for assignment on May 6, 2011, to make room for Jess Todd on the 40-man roster.

=== Detroit Tigers ===
On November 18, 2012, Russo signed a minor league deal with the Detroit Tigers with an invitation to spring training. Russo spent the 2013 season with the Toledo Mud Hens. He was re-signed for the 2014 season but was released by the end of March.

=== Sugar Land Skeeters ===
Russo signed with the Sugar Land Skeeters of the Atlantic League of Professional Baseball for the 2015 season. He became a free agent after the 2015 season.

== Coaching career ==
After retiring, Russo has served as a coach and instructor for Slammers North.
