= C. J. Wilson =

American baseball player (born 1980)

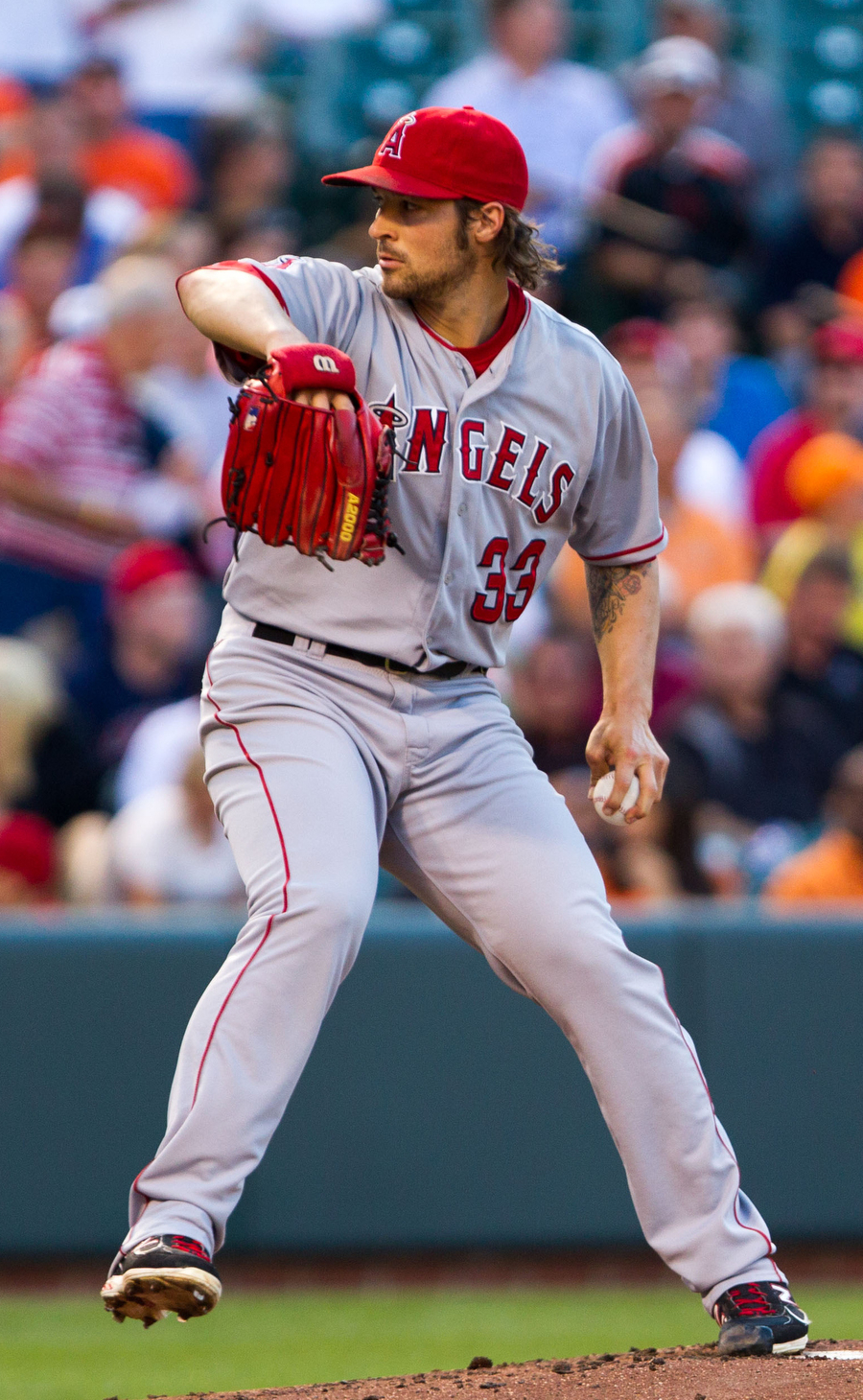
- Wilson with the Los Angeles Angels of Anaheim
- Pitcher
- Born: November 18, 1980 (age 45); Newport Beach, California, U.S.
- Batted: Left Threw: Left

MLB debut
- June 10, 2005, for the Texas Rangers

Last MLB appearance
- July 28, 2015, for the Los Angeles Angels of Anaheim

MLB statistics
- Win–loss record: 94–70
- Earned run average: 3.74
- Strikeouts: 1,259
- Stats at Baseball Reference

Teams
- Texas Rangers (2005–2011); Los Angeles Angels of Anaheim (2012–2015)

Career highlights and awards
- 2× All-Star (2011, 2012)

Christopher John Wilson (born November 18, 1980) is an American auto racing team owner and former professional baseball pitcher. Wilson pitched in Major League Baseball (MLB) for the Texas Rangers from 2005 to 2011 and the Los Angeles Angels of Anaheim from 2012 to 2015. He is the founder and owner of sports car team CJ Wilson Racing, which competes in IMSA Michelin Pilot Challenge full-time and WeatherTech SportsCar Championship part-time.

== College ==
After attending Fountain Valley High School (graduating in 1998), Wilson played at Santa Ana College where in 2000 he was named the MVP of the Orange Empire Conference, and awarded the California Junior College Co-Player of the Year award. Wilson played outfield, first base, starting pitcher, and relief pitcher at Loyola Marymount University during the 2001 season.

Wilson was drafted by the Rangers in the fifth round (141st overall) of the 2001 MLB draft.

== Professional career ==
=== Texas Rangers ===
After starting the 2001 season in Pulaski of the Appalachian League he was promoted to Class A with the Savannah Sand Gnats. He moved through High-A Charlotte (Florida State League) and into Double-A Tulsa (Texas League) by late 2002.

For 2003, Wilson returned to Double-A with Frisco RoughRiders of the Texas League, earning Pitcher of the Week honors in May. His up and down season was cut short due to injury which resulted in season-ending Tommy John surgery on August 12.

After missing all of 2004 due to the elbow injury, Wilson was able to return to Double-A in 2005 before being called up to the majors later that season. He posted a 1–7 record and 6.94 ERA in 24 games during his rookie campaign with the Rangers. Later in the season, Texas placed him in the bullpen full-time where he went 1–2 with a 2.73 ERA in 18 relief appearances.

Wilson started the 2006 season on the 15-day disabled list with a strained hamstring before returning to the team going 1–2 with a 5.16 ERA with the Rangers before getting optioned to Triple-A on June 1. While in the minors, he went 1–0 with a 2.45 ERA with two saves, and in 11 innings, he struck out 17 and walked five in nine appearances. After being recalled July 18, Wilson ended the season strong, posting second half numbers of a 3.29 ERA in 24 2/3 innings and 27 appearances and ending the season as the team's top left-handed setup man, posting a 2–4 record and 4.06 ERA overall for Texas. He proved especially tough against lefties, with an ERA of 1.77 with 19 strikeouts in 20 1/3 innings.

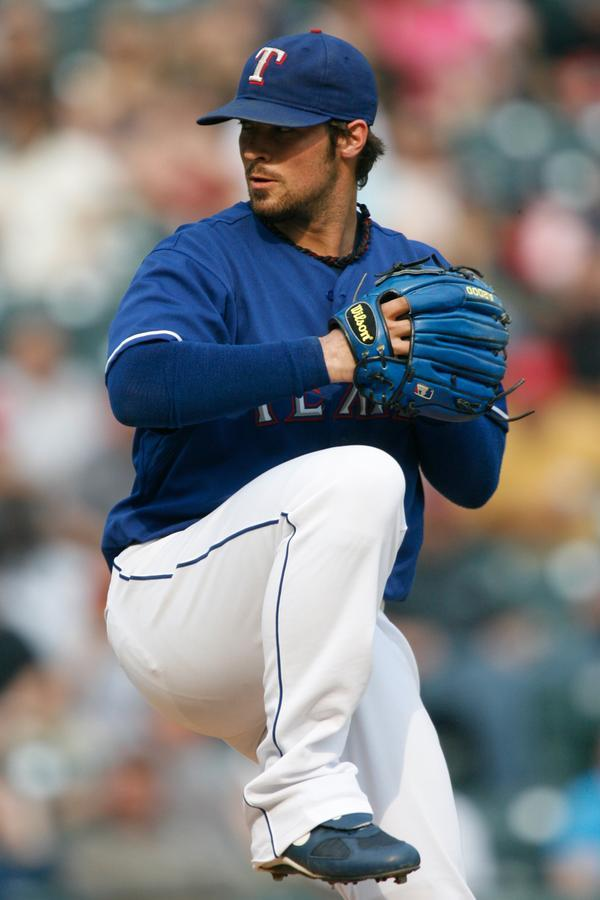
With the Texas Rangers, Wilson coordinated his glove color with that of his jersey

Following the trade of Éric Gagné, Wilson was used to close out games for the Rangers in 2007 converting his first 11 consecutive chances. Overall, he finished with career bests in: ERA (3.03), appearances (66), innings (68.1), strikeouts (63), WHIP (1.21), holds (15), and opposing batting average (.208).

Wilson was named the Rangers closer for the 2008 season. He had a 6.06 ERA and converted 24 of 28 save opportunities.

In 2009, Wilson returned to role of set-up man as Frank Francisco was named the closer. He set new career bests in: wins (5), innings (73.2), appearances (74), ERA (2.81), strikeouts (84), K/BB ratio (2.61), holds (19), home runs allowed (3) as well as recording 14 saves throughout the year and set a team record for the lowest home ERA for a single season (0.67).

In 2010, Wilson returned to his past role as a starting pitcher with Texas. Wilson had expressed an interest in returning to the rotation as early as 2006 and was told to report to spring training in condition to start. Early conjecture amongst sports writers and fans covering the Rangers spring training debated if Wilson would actually be able to earn a spot in the rotation. After making several impressive spring starts pitching coach Mike Maddux was asked if Wilson was making the rotation a tough call to which Maddux said, "He's making it a great call." Wilson was named the third starting pitcher in the rotation behind Scott Feldman and Rich Harden.

At the end of April, Wilson was leading the Rangers rotation with an ERA of 1.76 after 4 starts, fourth best in the AL. On May 7 against the Kansas City Royals, Wilson threw a complete game winning 4–1. It was Wilson's second credited complete game of the year and career, the previous being a rain-shortened six-inning loss to the Yankees. Wilson set 2 club records after his May 13 start against the A's with the most consecutive innings without a home run and most consecutive quality starts to start a season. Wilson gave up his first home run on May 19 against the Angels' Torii Hunter after 87 2/3 innings dating back from 2009. Wilson's consecutive quality starts also ended in the same game.

Wilson led the team in wins and ERA while throwing more than 200 innings. He was named the second starter behind Cliff Lee for the playoffs.

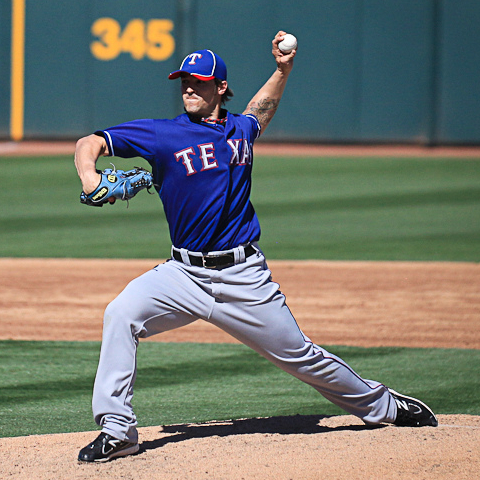
Wilson delivers a pitch for the Rangers in 2011

In Wilson's first playoff game, he pitched 6.1 innings allowing no runs on two hits, seven strikeouts, and two walks in a 6–0 win in Game 2 against the Tampa Rays in the American League Divisional playoff series. He threw 104 pitches supported by an Ian Kinsler home run and RBI single and a Michael Young 3-run home run in the fifth.

Wilson started the ALCS for the Rangers and pitched seven innings allowing three runs and six hits.

Wilson is just the sixth player in major league baseball history to go eight straight postseason starts without recording a victory.

Wilson was a 2011 American League All Star. After the Rangers clinched the AL West on September 23, manager Ron Washington announced Wilson would be the team's ALDS game one starting pitcher.

In 2011, Wilson was 16–7 with a 2.94 ERA (seventh in the AL). He led the league in games started (34), and was fourth in wins, fifth in win–loss percentage (.696), and sixth in strikeouts (206; sixth-most in Rangers history).

=== Los Angeles Angels of Anaheim ===
On December 8, 2011, Wilson agreed to a five-year, $77.5 million deal with the Los Angeles Angels of Anaheim. This deal came only hours after Albert Pujols signed a record breaking ten-year, $250 million deal with Anaheim. The contract became official on December 10.

On May 22, 2012, Wilson and Ernesto Frieri pitched a combined one-hit shutout against the Oakland Athletics in Oakland, a place Wilson said that he strongly disliked pitching while with the Texas Rangers. Wilson struck out seven and allowed two walks while giving up a single. He was selected to the All-Star Game in 2012 after going 9–5 with a 2.43 ERA for the Angels. He finished the season with a 13–10 record in 34 starts. He followed the 2012 season with another successful season, winning a career high 17 games while lowering his ERA from the prior season to 3.39.

Despite the team making the playoffs in 2014, Wilson did not have a good season, finishing with an ERA of 4.51 and leading the majors in walks with 85. Due to his high pitch counts, Wilson averaged less than 6 innings per start. Wilson's season was cut short in 2015, starting only 21 games before going out with an elbow injury in early August. He opted for elbow surgery.

Wilson started the 2016 season on the disabled list recovering from elbow and shoulder surgery. On July 5, it was announced that Wilson would undergo season-ending shoulder surgery, ending his career.

== Pitching technique ==
Wilson's pitching repertoire included a four-seam fastball (90–93 mph), a two-seam fastball (90–93), a cutter (88–91), slider (83–85), curveball (77–80), and changeup (84–87), thrown from a 3/4 arm angle. He hardly ever threw his changeup against left-handed hitters, while his slider was much more commonly used against lefties.

Wilson said he attempted to keep his opponents' batting average on balls in play down by "using [my] pitch mix a certain way" and by taking into account his defense's alignment when he pitches.

== Personal life ==
Wilson has two daughters with Brazilian model Lisalla Montenegro, whom he married in Laguna Beach, California, on December 15, 2013. Their wedding guests included professional wrestlers CM Punk and AJ Lee, who were scheduled to perform at the WWE pay-per-view TLC: Tables, Ladders & Chairs in Houston on the same day; Punk and Lee persuaded the company to move their respective matches to be the first and second of the event, allowing the couple to leave on time to attend the wedding.

A former Christian, Wilson is now a devout Taoist who follows a straight edge lifestyle which sees him abstaining from alcohol, recreational drugs, and promiscuous sex in order to maintain health. He has the words "Straight Edge" tattooed across his torso, Japanese characters on his shoulder that read "Poison Free", and repetitions of the straight edge "X" symbol stitched across his blue glove. The glove is itself unusual among baseball players, who generally wear a brown glove; Wilson wore the blue glove when the Rangers wore their blue uniforms, swapping it for a red one when pitching in games where the Rangers wore red. He also used a black glove, a brown glove, and at least one other red glove while playing for the Angels. During his time on the Angels, he also used a bright blue glove with red lacing that was embroidered with "X C.J. X".

In stark contrast to other MLB players, who he says are often apolitical, Wilson is interested in politics and was described in a 2008 ESPN article as "a free-thinking Californian with an appreciation for Obama, a dislike of Bush, a hatred of the Clintons, a detestation of SUVs, and a longing for a grass-roots political movement that would truly represent the needs of the people". His comments on what he perceived as typical baseball players' attitudes to politics in the article, and some of his posts on the blog lonestarball.com, generated minor controversy within the Rangers' clubhouse.

Wilson races racecars in his free time, and has mentioned he aims to be a professional racer after his baseball career; he is also highly interested in cars, having a collection of Porsches and a custom-painted McLaren P1. He won the E1 class in the 2010 25 Hours of Thunderhill. He races a Mazda MX-5 in club races and owns a race team that competes in the professional Global MX-5 Cup series. He also is the General Manager of Porsche Fresno and raced in the 2018 Pikes Peak International Hill Climb.

Wilson is the co-host of the podcast The Throttle Dogs. He is an investor in Bitcoin and has appeared on multiple podcasts with prominent Bitcoin podcasters, including Peter McCormack's What Bitcoin Did and Jimmy Song's Bitcoin Fixes This.
