= Colin Curtis (baseball) =

American baseball player (born 1985)

- Outfielder
- Born: February 1, 1985 (age 41); Issaquah, Washington, U.S.
- Batted: Left Threw: Left

MLB debut
- June 21, 2010, for the New York Yankees

Last MLB appearance
- October 2, 2010, for the New York Yankees

MLB statistics
- Batting average: .186
- Home runs: 1
- Runs batted in: 8
- Stats at Baseball Reference

Teams
- New York Yankees (2010)

Colin Benedict Curtis (born February 1, 1985) is an American former professional baseball outfielder. He played in Major League Baseball (MLB) for the New York Yankees in 2010.

== Amateur career ==
Curtis attended Issaquah High School, where he played baseball for the school. As a freshman, in 2000, Issaquah won the Class 3A state championship. Curtis was named to the All-King County Class 3A team in 2001, 2002, and 2003. He was named to the All-State team in 2002 and 2003.

Curtis was chosen in the 50th round of the 2003 Major League Baseball draft by the Cincinnati Reds, but he did not sign, choosing to attend Arizona State University to play college baseball for the Arizona State Sun Devils baseball team. In 2004 and 2005, he played collegiate summer baseball for the Orleans Cardinals of the Cape Cod Baseball League, and was named the MVP of the East division team at the league's annual all-star game in 2005.

== Professional career ==
=== New York Yankees (2006–2012) ===
The New York Yankees selected Curtis in the fourth round of the 2006 Major League Baseball draft. That year, he hit .302 in 44 games with the Staten Island Yankees of Short Season A-ball. In 2007, Curtis hit .298 with five home runs and 26 RBI in 65 games with the Tampa Yankees in High-A. He finished the year in Double-A with the Trenton Thunder.

Curtis repeated Double-A in 2008, hitting .255 with 10 home runs, 20 doubles, three triples and 71 RBI over 132 games. He reached Triple-A in 2009, but struggled when he hit .235 with six home runs and 29 RBI in 70 games for the Scranton/Wilkes-Barre Yankees. After the season, Curtis played in the Arizona Fall League.

He had a strong showing in spring training before the 2010 season, going 6-for-12 with two home runs in eight RBI. Curtis was called up to the major leagues on June 21, 2010. That night, he made his major league debut by pinch hitting for A. J. Burnett in the 5th inning. On June 22, Curtis recorded his first major league hit, a double off of Chad Qualls of the Arizona Diamondbacks. On July 21, he hit his first career home run against Scot Shields of the Los Angeles Angels of Anaheim. He was pinch hitting for Brett Gardner, who was ejected while batting with an 0–2 count in the bottom of the seventh inning. On July 31, Curtis was optioned back to Triple-A following the acquisition of outfielder Austin Kearns. He was promoted again on September 6.

In 2011, Curtis dislocated his shoulder making a catch in spring training. After an initial attempt to rehab the injury, he underwent surgery in April and missed the entire season. He was designated for assignment by the Yankees on December 9, 2011. In 2012, the Yankees invited Curtis to big league spring training as a non-roster invitee. He was released by the Yankees on August 1.

=== Somerset Patriots (2012) ===
Curtis signed with the Somerset Patriots of the independent Atlantic League of Professional Baseball a few days after he was released by the Yankees.

== Personal ==
During his freshman year of high school, at the age of 15, Curtis was diagnosed with testicular cancer. It spread to the veins in his stomach and around his lymph nodes. The treatment involved surgery to remove the tumor and parts of the affected veins and regular blood tests. While battling the disease, fellow testicular cancer survivor Lance Armstrong gave him an autographed book.
