= Colby Lewis =

American baseball player (born 1979)

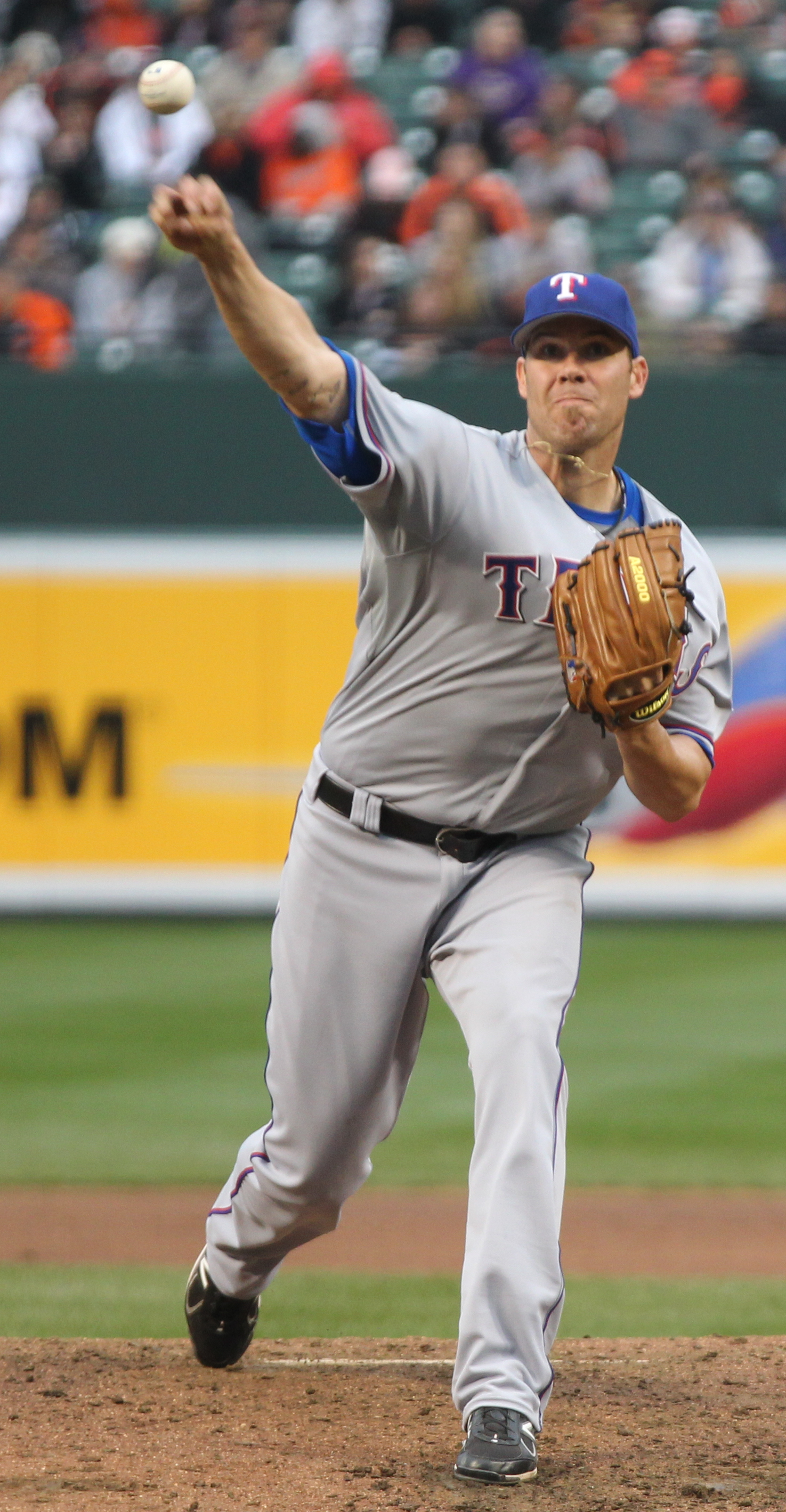
- Lewis with the Texas Rangers in 2011
- Pitcher
- Born: August 2, 1979 (age 46); Bakersfield, California, U.S.
- Batted: Right Threw: Right

Professional debut
- MLB: April 1, 2002, for the Texas Rangers
- NPB: 2008, for the Hiroshima Toyo Carp

Last appearance
- NPB: 2009, for the Hiroshima Toyo Carp
- MLB: October 1, 2016, for the Texas Rangers

MLB statistics
- Win–loss record: 77–72
- Earned run average: 4.70
- Strikeouts: 961

NPB statistics
- Win–loss record: 26–17
- Earned run average: 2.82
- Strikeouts: 369
- Stats at Baseball Reference

Teams
- Texas Rangers (2002–2004); Detroit Tigers (2006); Oakland Athletics (2007); Hiroshima Toyo Carp (2008–2009); Texas Rangers (2010–2012, 2014–2016)

Colby Preston Lewis (born August 2, 1979), popularly nicknamed "Cobra", is an American former professional baseball pitcher. He played in Major League Baseball (MLB) for the Detroit Tigers, Oakland Athletics, and Texas Rangers and in Nippon Professional Baseball (NPB) for the Hiroshima Toyo Carp.

Lewis was originally a first-round draft choice (sandwich pick) of the Texas Rangers in the 1999 Major League Baseball draft and made his major league debut in 2002. He played for the Hiroshima Toyo Carp of Japan's Central League from 2008 to 2009, during which he won two awards for most strikeouts. Upon his return to the Rangers, he helped lead the team to two consecutive American League pennants in 2010 and 2011.

== Amateur career ==
Lewis is a graduate of North High School in Bakersfield, California. Lewis attended Bakersfield College, where, as a sophomore, he won first team Western State Conference honors, going 4–5, striking out 108, and posting a 2.86 ERA.

== Professional career ==
=== Texas Rangers ===
Lewis was the 38th overall player selected in the 1999 Major League Baseball draft. He was a highly regarded prospect coming up in the Rangers' system and in three seasons with them had a career ERA of 6.83. Of particular note was his unusual 2003 season, where he managed to post a winning record of 10–9 in 26 starts despite a 7.30 ERA.

=== Detroit Tigers ===
Lewis suffered an injury early in the 2004 season and missed most of the year after undergoing rotator cuff surgery. He was claimed off waivers by the Detroit Tigers after the 2004 season. Lewis made only 2 appearances in 2006 with an ERA of exactly 3.00. Lewis would also be eligible to participate in the postseason despite his short tenured 2006 season. The Tigers ventured in the postseason but lost in the World Series to the St. Louis Cardinals.

=== Washington Nationals ===
In 2007, Lewis signed a minor league deal for the Washington Nationals. On March 20, 2007, the Nationals released him.

=== Oakland Athletics ===
About 4 days after his release from the Nationals, Lewis signed a minor league deal for the Oakland Athletics.

Lewis began 2007 on the A's Triple-A team, the Sacramento River Cats, where he posted an 8–3 record with a 1.88 ERA. The A's, in need of another starting pitcher to replace the injured Rich Harden, called up Lewis on May 22, 2007. He started the game that day against the Chicago White Sox. His A's debut was a disaster as he pitched 3.1 innings and gave up 10 runs on 12 hits in the A's 10–4 loss. He was immediately sent to the bullpen after that start. Lewis finished the 2007 season with an 0–2 record and a 6.45 ERA in 26 games. Following the 2007 season, on November 2, 2007, Lewis was claimed off waivers by Kansas City Royals; he was then released on December 5, 2007.

=== Hiroshima Toyo Carp ===
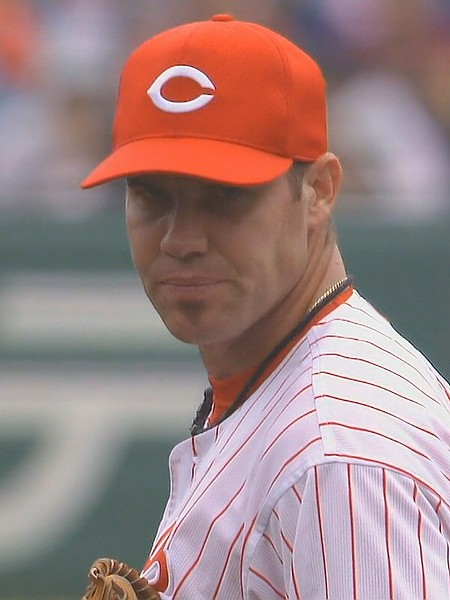
Lewis with the Hiroshima Toyo Carp

For the 2008 season, Lewis signed with the Hiroshima Carp of Japan's Central League. He had a spectacular season with Hiroshima, finishing second in the Central League in wins with 15 (Seth Greisinger of the Yomiuri Giants led the CL with 17 wins), second in the league in ERA (2.68, Masanori Ishikawa of the Yakult Swallows was first at 2.68), and 1st in the league in strikeouts (189), beating out Greisinger by almost 20 K's.

His 2009 season with the Carp was equally successful. Lewis finished with 186 strikeouts, again leading the league. Although his performance was outstanding, he resigned from the team in hopes of pitching once again in the Major Leagues.

He is also renowned for home runs, which is unusual for a pitcher. (The designated hitter rule is not used in the Central League except in interleague games.) He has 5 NPB career home runs (2 in 2008 and 3 in 2009).

=== Second stint with the Texas Rangers ===
==== 2010 ====
On January 14, 2010, Lewis agreed to a two-year contract with the Texas Rangers. At the end of April, he led the American League in strikeouts and was tied for second in the majors with Dan Haren behind Tim Lincecum. He got his first-ever complete game in Major League Baseball against the Houston Astros on June 19.

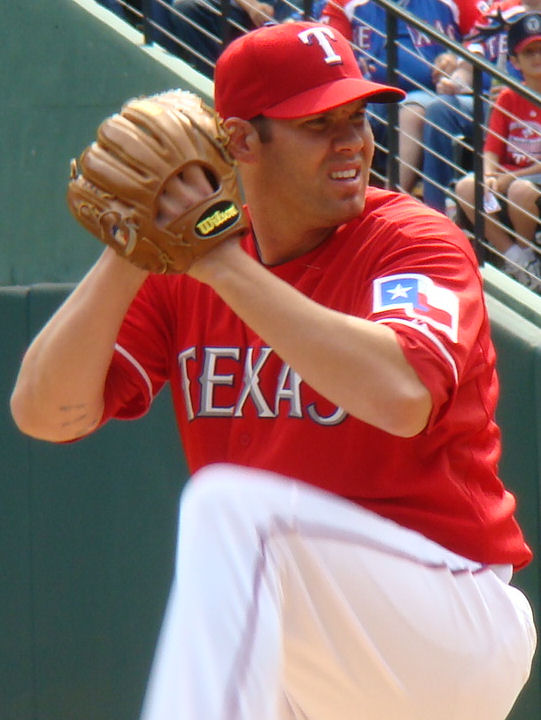
Lewis with the Rangers in 2010

On October 16, Lewis started Game 2 of the 2010 American League Championship Series at home against the New York Yankees. Lewis went 5.2 innings and gave up 2 earned runs on 6 hits. However, he earned the decision, and became the first Ranger pitcher to win a post-season home game in franchise history. On October 22, Lewis started Game 6 of the American League Championship Series, also at home, against the New York Yankees. He pitched 8 innings, allowing 1 run on 3 hits, aiding the Rangers to a decisive 6–1 victory. The win allowed the Rangers to win the Series and earn their first-ever American League Pennant. On October 30, Lewis started game 3 of the 2010 World Series, at home against the San Francisco Giants. Lewis went 7 2/3 innings, allowing 2 earned runs on 5 hits, and earned the win which was the first Rangers victory in a World Series game (and first World Series win for an MLB team in the state of Texas, as the Houston Astros were swept in the 2005 World Series). After winning those two crucial home playoff games in the 2010 ALCS and Game 3 of the 2010 World Series, Lewis was, so far, the only Rangers pitcher accredited towards three of the Rangers home playoff wins as no other Rangers pitcher had even one. The Rangers went on to lose the World Series in five games to the Giants.

==== 2011 ====
In April 2011 Lewis was the first MLB player to go on the league's newly created paternity leave list to attend the birth of his child. A player can be on the list for 24 to 72 hours. Lewis took one start off before returning to pitch against the Los Angeles Angels of Anaheim.

In 2011, Lewis was 14–10 with a 4.40 ERA. He gave up a league-leading 35 home runs, the 7th-most in Rangers history. In the 2011 postseason, Lewis pitched Game 3 in both the ALDS and ALCS, and Games 2 and 6 of the World Series, which the Rangers eventually lost to the Cardinals in seven games.

==== 2012 ====
In the 2012 season, Lewis went 6–6 with an ERA of 3.43 until being placed on the disabled list due to a torn flexor tendon in his right elbow.

==== 2013 ====
Lewis began the 2013 season on the 60-day disabled list as he was still recovering from the elbow surgery he previously had. He was expected to return after the All-Star break, but was subsequently announced to be out for the rest of the season due to bone spurs in his right hip. His elbow has recovered post surgery and rehab with a AA Frisco Rough Riders rehab assignment. On August 22, Lewis underwent hip resurfacing surgery at the Hospital for Special Surgery in New York City. Lewis followed that with a rigorous rehab program, and he was re-signed by the Rangers to a minor-league deal in November.

==== 2014 ====
Lewis pitched for the Rangers in 2014 spring training, include a shutout start versus the Seattle Mariners. After spring training, Lewis was assigned to the AAA Round Rock Express. April 14, 2014, marked Lewis' return to MLB, starting a game against the Seattle Mariners.

==== 2015 ====
On September 11, Lewis had the best outing in his career when he flirted with a perfect game against the Oakland Athletics through seven innings. However, Danny Valencia broke up the perfect game and no-hitter with a lead off double in the 8th inning, but Lewis went on to pitch a two hit complete game shutout in a 4–0 Rangers victory, with the other hit being a Max Muncy single. Lewis finished the 2015 season with a win–loss record of 17-9 and a 4.66 ERA.

==== 2016 ====
On January 18, 2016, Lewis re-signed with the Rangers on a 1-year, $6 million contract.

On May 20, 2016, in the bottom of the seventh inning, a line drive from Carlos Correa hit Lewis in the back of the head, which proceeded to bounce high enough into the air to allow Rougned Odor to catch it from behind the second base to make the first out. Lewis was able to stay in the game afterwards.

On June 16, 2016, Lewis again flirted with perfection against the Oakland, not allowing a baserunner until the 8th inning, when he walked Yonder Alonso. Max Muncy later broke up the no-hitter in the 9th with a double that was nearly caught, and Lewis finished out the 5–1 complete game victory. The start improved Lewis's record to 6–0, and his ERA dropped to 2.81, good for 5th in the American League, and best in the Rangers AL-leading rotation at the time. However, Lewis lost all of his next five starts between June and September (missing all of July and August due to a lat strain), finishing the year with a 6–5 record and a 3.71 ERA. He became a free agent following the season.

== Post-playing career ==
Lewis was hired by the Rangers on November 6, 2017, to be a special assistant to general manager Jon Daniels.

Lewis served as the bullpen coach for the National League team in the 2024 All-Star Futures Game.

== Pitching repertoire ==
Lewis threw two fastballs: a four-seamer at 90 miles per hour and a sinker at 89 miles per hour. His changeup and slider both averaged 84 mph, while his curveball sat in the high 70s.

== Personal life ==
Lewis' wife, Jenny, gave birth to their second child, Elizabeth Grace Lewis, in April 2011. Lewis skipped a start with the Rangers to be present for his daughter's birth.
