= Dustin Moseley =

American baseball player (born 1981)

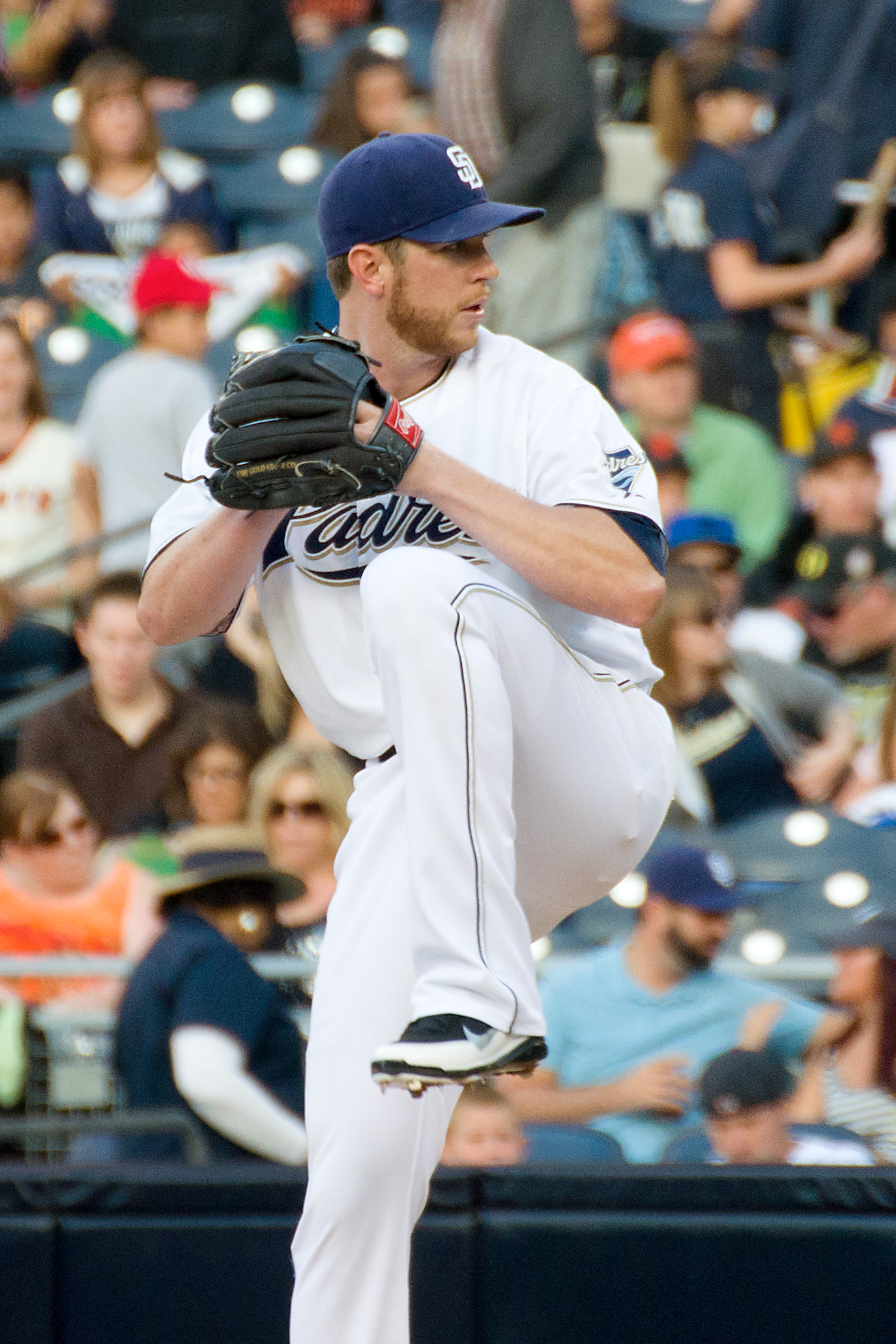
- Moseley with the San Diego Padres in 2011
- Pitcher
- Born: December 26, 1981 (age 44); Texarkana, Arkansas, U.S.
- Batted: Right Threw: Right

MLB debut
- July 17, 2006, for the Los Angeles Angels of Anaheim

Last MLB appearance
- April 7, 2012, for the San Diego Padres

MLB statistics
- Win–loss record: 15–21
- Earned run average: 4.67
- Strikeouts: 199
- Stats at Baseball Reference

Teams
- Los Angeles Angels of Anaheim (2006–2009); New York Yankees (2010); San Diego Padres (2011–2012)

Dustin Aaron Moseley (born December 26, 1981) is an American former professional baseball pitcher. He played in Major League Baseball (MLB) for the Los Angeles Angels of Anaheim, New York Yankees and San Diego Padres.

== Career ==
=== Cincinnati Reds ===
Moseley was selected by the Cincinnati Reds in the first round (34th overall) of the 2000 Major League Baseball draft. Prior to the 2004 season, he was ranked by Baseball America as the fourth best prospect in the Reds' organization.

=== Los Angeles Angels of Anaheim ===
Moseley was traded to the Angels' organization in exchange for pitcher Ramón Ortiz in 2004.

Moseley won his first game as the starting pitcher for the Angels in his Major League Baseball debut on July 17, 2006. With injuries to key starters Bartolo Colón and Jered Weaver, Moseley began the 2007 season in the Angels starting rotation. After the return of Jered Weaver, he was moved to the bullpen in middle relief.

Moseley had surgery to repair an ulnar nerve following the 2007 season. He had hip surgery during 2009 season.

Moseley became a free agent after the 2009 season.

=== New York Yankees ===
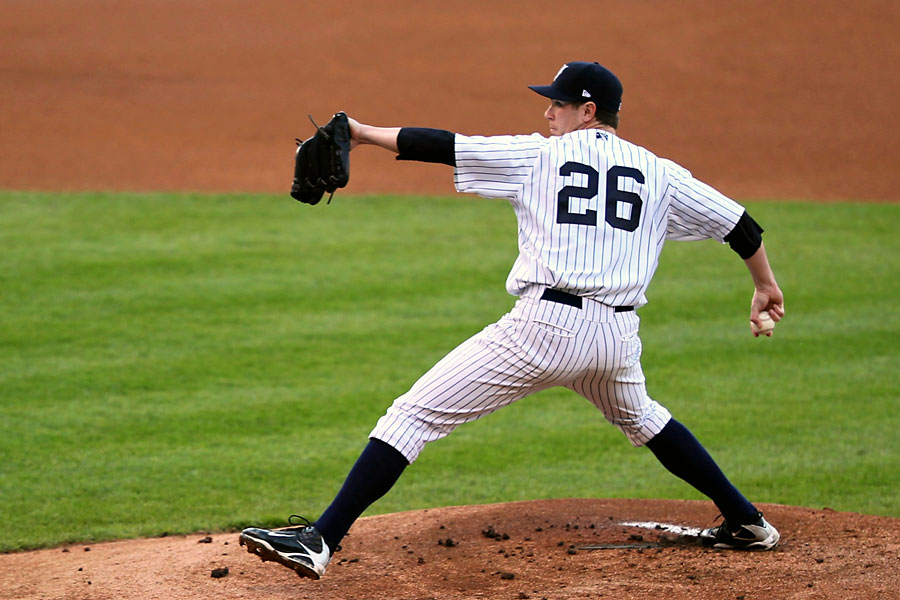
Moseley pitching for the Scranton/Wilkes-Barre Yankees, Triple-A affiliates of the New York Yankees, in 2010.

In 2010, Moseley was a non-roster invitee to spring training with the New York Yankees. He began the season with the Triple-A Scranton/Wilkes-Barre Yankees. On July 2, 2010, he was called up to the Yankees. He was inserted in the Yankees' starting rotation, while Andy Pettitte was on the disabled list. He was non-tendered after the season.

=== San Diego Padres ===
After the 2010 season, Moseley signed a one-year contract with the San Diego Padres. He struggled during the season partly due to a lack of run support. On July 26, he dislocated his left shoulder after getting a base hit, which ended his season with a 3–10 record and 3.30 ERA (a career best) in 120 innings. On May 7, 2012, Moseley was again placed on the disabled list due to labrum damage in his right shoulder.

After making only 1 start in 2012, Moseley elected free agency after clearing outright waivers. Moseley was a non-tender candidate by the Padres.

=== Miami Marlins ===
After sitting out the 2013 season, Moseley agreed to a minor league contract with the Miami Marlins organization on July 20, 2014. Moseley made just 6 starts between the Single–A Greensboro Grasshoppers and Double–A Jacksonville Suns before he was placed on the 7–day disabled list. He became a free agent after the 2014 season.

== Pitching repertoire ==
Moseley relied primarily on an 89-90 mile per hour four-seam fastball, and also threw a curveball and a changeup.
