= 2010 Major League Baseball season =

2010 MLB season
- League: Major League Baseball
- Sport: Baseball
- Duration: April 4 – November 1, 2010
- Games: 162
- Teams: 30
- TV partner(s): Fox; TBS; ESPN; MLB Network

Draft
- Top draft pick: Bryce Harper
- Picked by: Washington Nationals

Regular season
- Season MVP: NL: Joey Votto (CIN); AL: Josh Hamilton (TEX)

Postseason
- AL champions: Texas Rangers
- AL runners-up: New York Yankees
- NL champions: San Francisco Giants
- NL runners-up: Philadelphia Phillies

World Series
- Champions: San Francisco Giants
- Runners-up: Texas Rangers
- World Series MVP: Édgar Rentería (SF)

MLB seasons
- ← 2009 2011 →

The 2010 Major League Baseball season began April 4, with the regular season ending on October 3. The 2010 All-Star Game was played on July 13 at Angel Stadium of Anaheim in Anaheim, California. The National League ended a 13-game winless streak with a 3–1 victory. Due to this result, the World Series began October 27 in the city of the National League Champion, the San Francisco Giants, and ended November 1 when the Giants defeated the American League Champion Texas Rangers, four games to one.

== Standings ==
=== American League ===
AL East
Team	W	L	Pct.	GB	Home	Road
^{(1)} Tampa Bay Rays	96	66	.593	—	49‍–‍32	47‍–‍34
^{(4)} New York Yankees	95	67	.586	1	52‍–‍29	43‍–‍38
Boston Red Sox	89	73	.549	7	46‍–‍35	43‍–‍38
Toronto Blue Jays	85	77	.525	11	45‍–‍33	40‍–‍44
Baltimore Orioles	66	96	.407	30	37‍–‍44	29‍–‍52

AL Central
Team	W	L	Pct.	GB	Home	Road
^{(2)} Minnesota Twins	94	68	.580	—	53‍–‍28	41‍–‍40
Chicago White Sox	88	74	.543	6	45‍–‍36	43‍–‍38
Detroit Tigers	81	81	.500	13	52‍–‍29	29‍–‍52
Cleveland Indians	69	93	.426	25	38‍–‍43	31‍–‍50
Kansas City Royals	67	95	.414	27	38‍–‍43	29‍–‍52

AL West
Team	W	L	Pct.	GB	Home	Road
^{(3)} Texas Rangers	90	72	.556	—	51‍–‍30	39‍–‍42
Oakland Athletics	81	81	.500	9	47‍–‍34	34‍–‍47
Los Angeles Angels	80	82	.494	10	43‍–‍38	37‍–‍44
Seattle Mariners	61	101	.377	29	35‍–‍46	26‍–‍55

=== National League ===
NL East
Team	W	L	Pct.	GB	Home	Road
^{(1)} Philadelphia Phillies	97	65	.599	—	54‍–‍30	43‍–‍35
^{(4)} Atlanta Braves	91	71	.562	6	56‍–‍25	35‍–‍46
Florida Marlins	80	82	.494	17	41‍–‍40	39‍–‍42
New York Mets	79	83	.488	18	47‍–‍34	32‍–‍49
Washington Nationals	69	93	.426	28	41‍–‍40	28‍–‍53

NL Central
Team	W	L	Pct.	GB	Home	Road
^{(3)} Cincinnati Reds	91	71	.562	—	49‍–‍32	42‍–‍39
St. Louis Cardinals	86	76	.531	5	52‍–‍29	34‍–‍47
Milwaukee Brewers	77	85	.475	14	40‍–‍41	37‍–‍44
Houston Astros	76	86	.469	15	42‍–‍39	34‍–‍47
Chicago Cubs	75	87	.463	16	35‍–‍46	40‍–‍41
Pittsburgh Pirates	57	105	.352	34	40‍–‍41	17‍–‍64

NL West
Team	W	L	Pct.	GB	Home	Road
^{(2)} San Francisco Giants	92	70	.568	—	49‍–‍32	43‍–‍38
San Diego Padres	90	72	.556	2	45‍–‍36	45‍–‍36
Colorado Rockies	83	79	.512	9	52‍–‍29	31‍–‍50
Los Angeles Dodgers	80	82	.494	12	45‍–‍36	35‍–‍46
Arizona Diamondbacks	65	97	.401	27	40‍–‍41	25‍–‍56

== Postseason ==
=== Bracket ===
Division Series (ALDS, NLDS)
1	Tampa Bay	2
3	Texas	3
American League
2	Minnesota	0
4	NY Yankees	3
1	Philadelphia	3
3	Cincinnati	0
National League
2	San Francisco	3
4	Atlanta	1

League Championship Series (ALCS, NLCS)
3	Texas	4
4	NY Yankees	2
1	Philadelphia	2
2	San Francisco	4

World Series
AL3	Texas	1
NL2	San Francisco	4

Note: Two teams in the same division could not meet in the division series.

== The Year of the Pitcher ==
For much of the season, 2010 was frequently labeled the Year of the Pitcher (though this title is also taken by the 1968 season). 2010 saw many significant pitching achievements, including:

- Six no-hitters were thrown. They were thrown by Ubaldo Jiménez (April 17), Dallas Braden (May 9), Roy Halladay (May 29), Edwin Jackson (June 25), Matt Garza (July 26), and Halladay again, this time in Game 1 of the NLDS. It was only the third time in major league history that at least six no-hitters were thrown in a single season. Braden's no-hitter and Halladay's first were both perfect games.
- Armando Galarraga's near-perfect game (June 2), in which Galarraga set down the first twenty-six Cleveland Indians batters in order before umpire Jim Joyce incorrectly ruled Jason Donald safe at first on a ground ball. If not for Joyce's mistaken call, Galarraga's would have been the third perfect game in a season (an MLB record, but it was later done in 2012 by Philip Humber, Matt Cain, and Félix Hernández), and the third in less than a month.
- MLB pitchers combined for 329 shutouts (the most since 1972, when there were 357) and a record 34,306 strikeouts (an average of 1,144 per team).
- A record-tying 15 pitchers recorded 200 or more strikeouts.
- Neftalí Feliz of the Texas Rangers earned 40 saves, breaking the record for most saves in a season for a rookie (previously held by Kazuhiro Sasaki).
- Stephen Strasburg of the Washington Nationals struck out 41 batters in his first four major league starts, a major league record.

== Managerial changes ==
=== General managers ===
==== Off-season ====
Team	Former GM	New GM	Former job
San Diego Padres	Kevin Towers	Jed Hoyer	Hoyer served as the Boston Red Sox assistant GM.
Toronto Blue Jays	J. P. Ricciardi	Alex Anthopoulos	Anthopoulos was Riccardi's assistant GM in Toronto.

==== In-season ====
Date	Team	Former GM	New GM	Former job
July 1	Arizona Diamondbacks	Josh Byrnes	Jerry Dipoto	Dipoto was assistant GM.
September 22	Arizona Diamondbacks	Jerry DiPoto	Kevin Towers	Towers signed a two-year deal in September.

=== Field managers ===
==== Off season ====
Team	Former manager	New manager	Former job
Cleveland Indians	Eric Wedge	Manny Acta	Was manager of Washington Nationals 2007–2009.
Houston Astros	Dave Clark *	Brad Mills	Bench coach for Boston Red Sox.

* Served as interim manager, replacing Cecil Cooper.

The following managers who were interim managers for 2009 will lead their respective teams in 2010:

Team	Manager that started 2009 season	Replacement	Job prior to becoming manager
Colorado Rockies	Clint Hurdle	Jim Tracy	Bench Coach for the Rockies during the 2009 season. After Hurdle was fired, Tracy took over as interim manager and won Manager of the Year in the National League, and will continue to serve as the manager for the 2010 season.
Arizona Diamondbacks	Bob Melvin	A. J. Hinch	Director of player development for the Diamondbacks. Melvin was fired during the 2009 season and Hinch served as the interim manager for the remainder of the season.
Washington Nationals	Manny Acta	Jim Riggleman	Bench Coach for the Nationals during the 2009 season. Riggleman took over as interim manager for the 2009 season after Acta was fired during the All-Star Break.

==== In-season changes ====
Date	Team	Former manager	Replacement	Previous Job
May 13	Kansas City Royals	Trey Hillman	Ned Yost	Yost last managed with the Milwaukee Brewers in 2008. Yost signed a two-year extension July 31 to remain manager.
June 4	Baltimore Orioles	Dave Trembley	Juan Samuel	Third base coach; serving on an interim basis from June 4 through August 3, when Buck Showalter replaced him.
June 23	Florida Marlins	Fredi González	Edwin Rodríguez	Spent the past 1 1/2 years managing the New Orleans Zephyrs, the Marlins' Triple-A affiliate.
July 1	Arizona Diamondbacks	A. J. Hinch	Kirk Gibson	Best known for his dramatic walk-off home run in Game 1 of the 1988 World Series as a member of the Los Angeles Dodgers, Gibson was the D-Backs' bench coach.
August 3	Baltimore Orioles	Juan Samuel	Buck Showalter	Showalter, who was with ESPN as an analyst on Baseball Tonight, last managed with the Texas Rangers in 2006.
August 9	Seattle Mariners	Don Wakamatsu	Daren Brown	Brown was in his fourth season managing the Tacoma Rainiers, the Mariners' Triple-A affiliate.
August 22	Chicago Cubs	Lou Piniella	Mike Quade	Piniella stepped down early from an earlier announcement of his retirement at the end of the season to tend to his mother's failing health. Quade served as the third-base coach of the Cubs and was named interim manager for the remainder of the season.

== League leaders ==
=== American League ===
Batting leaders
Stat	Player	Total
AVG	Josh Hamilton (TEX)	.359
HR	José Bautista (TOR)	54
RBI	Miguel Cabrera (DET)	126
R	Mark Teixeira (NYY)	113
H	Ichiro Suzuki (SEA)	214
SB	Juan Pierre (CWS)	68

Pitching leaders
Stat	Player	Total
W	CC Sabathia (NYY)	21
L	Kevin Millwood (BAL)	16
ERA	Félix Hernández (SEA)	2.27
K	Jered Weaver (LAA)	233
IP	Félix Hernández (SEA)	249.2
SV	Rafael Soriano (TB)	45

=== National League ===
Batting leaders
Stat	Player	Total
AVG	Carlos Gonzalez (COL)	.336
HR	Albert Pujols (STL)	42
RBI	Albert Pujols (STL)	118
R	Albert Pujols (STL)	115
H	Carlos Gonzalez (COL)	197
SB	Michael Bourn (HOU)	52

Pitching leaders
Stat	Player	Total
W	Roy Halladay (PHI)	21
L	Rodrigo Lopez (AZ)	16
ERA	Josh Johnson (FLA)	2.30
K	Tim Lincecum (SF)	231
IP	Roy Halladay (PHI)	250.2
SV	Brian Wilson (SF)	48

== Milestones ==
=== Reached ===
==== Batters ====
- Manny Ramirez (CWS)/(LAD):
  - As a member of the Los Angeles Dodgers, Ramirez recorded his 2500th career hit with a single in the 5th inning against the Florida Marlins on April 10. Ramirez became the 91st player to reach this mark.
  - Ramírez hit his 550th career home run in the 2nd inning against the Arizona Diamondbacks on May 31. He became the 14th player to reach this mark.
- Iván Rodríguez (WSH):
  - Recorded his 550th career double in the 6th inning against the Philadelphia Phillies on April 12. "Pudge" became the 23rd player to reach this mark.
- Johnny Damon (DET):
  - Recorded his 1000th career RBI with a double in the 5th inning against the Kansas City Royals on April 14. Damon became the 264th player to reach this mark.
  - Scored his 1500th career run in the 1st inning against the Los Angeles Angels on April 30. He became the 68th player to reach this mark.
  - Recorded his 2500th career hit with a single in the 3rd inning against the Baltimore Orioles on July 6. He became the 92nd player to reach this mark.
  - Collected his 100th career triple against the Texas Rangers on September 15. He became 160th the player to reach this mark.
- José Guillén (KC):
  - Recorded his 200th career home run in the 7th inning against the Detroit Tigers on April 14. Guillen became the 296th player to reach this mark. On August 13, Guillen was traded to the San Francisco Giants.
- Magglio Ordóñez (DET):
  - Recorded his 1000th career run scored in the 3rd inning on a Carlos Guillén ground out against the Los Angeles Angels on April 22. Ordonez became the 303rd player to reach this mark.
  - Recorded his 2000th career hit with a single in the 4th inning against the Minnesota Twins on April 29. He became the 260th player to reach this mark.
- David Wright (NYM):
  - Becomes the youngest in Mets history to record his 1000th hit. He reached that mark with a single in the 5th inning against the Los Angeles Dodgers in the second game of a doubleheader on April 27.
- Orlando Cabrera (CIN):
  - Recorded his 200th career stolen base in the 6th inning against the St. Louis Cardinals on April 30. Cabrera became the 337th player to reach this mark.
- Vernon Wells (TOR):
  - Recorded his 200th career home run in the 5th inning against the Oakland Athletics on April 30. Wells became the 297th player to reach this mark.
- Jason Kendall (KC):
  - Was hit by a pitch for the 250th career time on May 12 against the Cleveland Indians. Fausto Carmona was the pitcher that hit him in the 4th inning as Kendall became the 5th player to reach this mark.
  - Scored his 1000th career run on a Mike Avilés single in the 3rd inning against the Cleveland Indians on May 19. He became the 304th player to reach this mark.
- Lance Berkman (NYY)/(HOU):
  - As a member of the Houston Astros, Berkman walked for the 1000th career time on May 27 against the Milwaukee Brewers in the 5th inning by David Bush. Berkman became the 110th player to reach this mark.
  - Berkman, also as a member of the Astros, scored his 1000th career run on a home run on July 8 against the Pittsburgh Pirates. He became the 306th player to reach this mark.
  - Berkman was traded to the New York Yankees on July 30.
- Mark Teixeira (NYY):
  - Recorded his 250th career home run in the 7th inning against the Cleveland Indians on May 30. Teixeira became the 197th player to reach this mark.
- Bobby Abreu (LAA):
  - Recorded his 500th career double in the 1st inning against the Kansas City Royals on June 2. Abreu became the 51st player to reach this mark.
  - Recorded his ninth 20–20 season (20 home runs-20 stolen bases) by hitting his 20th home run on September 19. This is the third-most in history. Bobby Bonds and Barry Bonds hold the record by having ten 20–20 seasons.
- Ichiro Suzuki (SEA):
  - Scored his 1000th career run in the 5th inning against the Los Angeles Angels on June 5. Ichiro became the 305th player to reach this mark.
  - Extended his own record of consecutive 200-hit seasons to ten with a single in the 5th inning against the Toronto Blue Jays on September 23. He has tied Pete Rose for most 200-hit seasons in Major League history.
- Derrek Lee (ATL)/(CHC):
  - As a member of the Chicago Cubs, Lee recorded his 300th career home run against the Milwaukee Brewers on June 9. Lee became the 126th player to reach this mark.
  - Also as a member of the Cubs, Lee scored his 1000th career run against the Colorado Rockies on July 31. He became the 307th player to reach this mark.
  - Lee was traded to the Atlanta Braves on August 18.
  - As a member of the Braves, collected his 1000th career RBI against the Colorado Rockies on August 25. He became the 267th player to reach this mark.
- Carlos Peña (TB):
  - Hit his 129th home run as a member of the Rays setting the franchise record against the Toronto Blue Jays on June 10. Pena broke the record that was previously held by Aubrey Huff.
- Alfonso Soriano (CHC):
  - Hit his 300th career home run in the 2nd inning against the Chicago White Sox on June 11. Soriano became the 127th player to reach this mark.
- Jorge Posada (NYY):
  - Hit his 250th career home run in the 3rd inning against the Houston Astros on June 12. Posada became the 198th player to reach this mark.
  - Recorded his 1000th career RBI in the 1st inning against the Kansas City Royals on July 23. He became the 265th player to reach this mark.
- Michael Young (TEX):
  - Collected his 1748th hit as a Ranger with a single in the 8th inning against the Florida Marlins. He broke the record that was previously held by Iván Rodríguez.
- Chone Figgins (SEA):
  - Collected his 300th career stolen base against the Milwaukee Brewers on June 26. Figgins became the 156th player to reach this mark.
- Jim Thome (MIN):
  - Scored his 1500th career run against the Detroit Tigers on June 28. Thome became the 69th player to reach this mark.
- Scott Rolen (CIN):
  - Hit his 300th career home run against the Philadelphia Phillies on June 28. Rolen became the 128th player to reach this mark.
- Corey Patterson (BAL):
  - Collected his 200th career stolen base against the Detroit Tigers on July 5. Patterson became the 338th player to reach this mark.
- Matt Stairs (SD):
  - Hit his 20th career pinch hit home run off of Washington Nationals closer Matt Capps in the 9th inning on July 7. This ties the major league record held by Cliff Johnson.
- Torii Hunter (LAA):
  - Hit his 250th career home run against the Oakland Athletics on July 9. Hunter became the 199th player to reach this mark.
- Andruw Jones (CWS):
  - Hit his 400th career home run against the Kansas City Royals on July 11. Jones became the 46th player to reach this mark.
- Brooks Conrad (ATL):
  - Became the only rookie in Major League history to hit two pinch-hit grand slams in the same season and the fifth overall. His first grand slam came on May 20 and his record setting grand slam came on July 24. The others to accomplish this feat are Davey Johnson of the Philadelphia Phillies, Mike Ivie of the San Francisco Giants, Darryl Strawberry of the New York Mets and Ben Broussard of the Cleveland Indians.
- Paul Konerko (CWS):
  - Hit his 350th career home run against the Seattle Mariners on July 28. Konerko became the 80th player to reach this mark.
- Carl Crawford (TB):
  - Collected his 400th career stolen base against the New York Yankees on July 31. Crawford became the 68th player to reach this mark.
  - Collected his 100th career triple against the Texas Rangers on August 17. He became 159th the player to reach this mark.
  - By hitting his 100th career home run on August 29, Crawford becomes the eighth Major League player since 1900 to reach 100 home runs, 100 triples and 400 stolen bases for his career. He joins Ty Cobb, Tris Speaker, Lou Brock, Frankie Frisch, Kenny Lofton, Paul Molitor and Tim Raines as the only players to reach this milestone.
- Dan Uggla (FLA):
  - Hit his 144th career home run as a Marlin to set the team record on August 1. Uggla broke the record that was previously held by Mike Lowell. Uggla hit the home run off of the Padres Kevin Correia.
  - Became the first second baseman in Major League history to record four 30-homer seasons by hitting a two-run homer in the 8th inning on September 13 against the Philadelphia Phillies.
- Alex Rodriguez (NYY):
  - Hit his 600th career home run against the Toronto Blue Jays on August 4. Rodriguez became the seventh player to reach this mark. Rodriguez is the youngest player to hit 600, at 35 years and eight days—a year and 188 days younger than Babe Ruth was when he swatted 600. Rodriguez is fourth-quickest to the mark in terms of at-bats. He hit 600 in his 8,689th at-bat, behind Ruth (6,921), Barry Bonds (8,211) and Sammy Sosa (8,637). It was also the same day of the year that he hit his 500th career home run.
  - Collected his 300th stolen base on August 8 against the Boston Red Sox. He became the 158th player to reach this mark.
  - Collected his 100th RBI of the season on September 6 against the Baltimore Orioles on a sacrifice fly in the 6th inning. Rodriguez has reached 100 RBI for a Major League record 14th season.
  - With his 30th home run on September 29 against the Toronto Blue Jays, Rodriguez extended his record of 30 home runs and 100 RBIs seasons to 14.
- Chipper Jones (ATL):
  - Scored his 1500th career run against the New York Mets on August 4. Jones became the 70th player to reach this mark.
- Juan Pierre (CWS):
  - Collected his 500th career stolen base against the Detroit Tigers on August 5. Pierre became the 37th player to reach this mark.
- Omar Vizquel (CWS):
  - Collected his 1000th career free pass by walking in 3rd inning on August 5 against the Detroit Tigers. Vizquel became the 111th player to reach this mark.
- J. P. Arencibia (TOR):
  - Became the sixth player to hit two home runs in his Major League debut on August 7 against the Tampa Bay Rays, hitting home runs in the second and sixth innings.
- Scott Podsednik (LAD)/(KC):
  - Collected his 300th career stolen base on August 8 against the Washington Nationals. Podsednik became the 157th player to reach this mark.
- Aramis Ramírez (CHC):
  - Collected his 1000th career RBI in the 1st inning against the San Francisco Giants on August 10. Ramirez became the 266th player to reach this mark.
- Adam LaRoche / Miguel Montero / Mark Reynolds / Stephen Drew (AZ):
  - Became the seventh group of players to hit four consecutive home runs in the 4th inning on August 11 against the Milwaukee Brewers.
- Albert Pujols (STL):
  - Pujols became the first player in major league history to begin a career with 10 straight 30-plus homer seasons by hitting a home run on August 15.
  - Hit his 400th career home run against the Washington Nationals on August 26. He became the 47th player to reach this mark. He became the third youngest player to reach this mark. Alex Rodriguez is the youngest player to get to 400 homers, having done so at 29 years, 316 days. Ken Griffey Jr. reached the benchmark at 30 years, 141 days. Pujols reached it at 30 years, 222 days.
- Luis Castillo (NYM):
  - Scored his 1000th career run against the Chicago Cubs on September 4. Castillo became the 308th player to reach this mark.
- Adam Dunn (WSH):
  - Hit his 350th career home run against the Pittsburgh Pirates on September 5. Dunn became the 81st player to reach this mark.
- Ryan Howard (PHI):
  - Hit his 250th career home run against the Florida Marlins on September 8. Howard became the 200th player to reach this mark. Howard's home run came in his 855th career game and is the fastest player in terms of games played to reach 250 career home runs in Major League history. The previous record was held by Ralph Kiner, who did it in 871 games.
- Adrián Beltré (BOS):
  - Collected his 1000th career RBI in the 2nd inning against the Tampa Bay Rays on September 8. Beltre became the 268th player to reach this mark.
- Carlos Lee (HOU):
  - Scored his 1000th career run against the Milwaukee Brewers on September 13. Lee became the 309th player to reach this mark.
- José Bautista (TOR):
  - Tied the Blue Jays team record for home runs in a season by hitting his 47th home run in the 1st inning against the Baltimore Orioles on September 15. He tied the team record that was set in 1987 by George Bell.
  - Set the team record by hitting his 48th home run in the 6th inning against the Boston Red Sox on September 17.
  - Became the 26th player in Major League history to hit 50 home runs in a single season on September 23 against the Seattle Mariners. His home run against Mariners Félix Hernández marked the 42nd time (22nd in the American League) that a player has reach the 50 home run plateau.
  - With a walk in the first inning on October 2 against the Minnesota Twins, he became the seventh player in major league history to record at least 50 home runs, 100 walks and 30 doubles in the same season. Bautista joins Luis Gonzalez, Sammy Sosa, Hack Wilson, Jimmie Foxx, Barry Bonds and Babe Ruth in accomplishing this feat.
- Miguel Tejada (SD)/(BAL):
  - Hit his 300th career home run against the Los Angeles Dodgers on September 22. Tejada became the 129th player to reach this mark.
- David Ortiz (BOS):
  - Collected his 1000th RBI as a designated hitter on September 29 against the Chicago White Sox. Ortiz became the second player to top 1000 RBI as a DH joining Edgar Martínez who finished his career with 1003 RBI as a DH.
- Austin Jackson (DET):
  - Became the fourth rookie since 1901 with 100 runs, 180 hits, 30 doubles, 10 triples and 25 stolen bases in a season with a single on September 29 against the Cleveland Indians. He joins Joe Jackson (1911), Juan Samuel (1984) and Hanley Ramírez (2006) as the only rookies to accomplish this feat in Major League history.
- Jay Bruce (CIN):
  - On September 29, Bruce joined Bobby Thomson (Giants, 1951), Hank Aaron (Braves, 1957), Alfonso Soriano (Yankees, 1999) and Steve Finley (Dodgers, 2004) as the only players in major league history to hit a home run that clinched their team's postseason berth.

==== Pitchers ====
===== Perfect games =====
- Dallas Braden (OAK):
  - Threw the 19th perfect game in Major League history, defeating the Tampa Bay Rays 4–0 on May 9, Mother's Day in the USA. Symbolically and coincidentally (as he had lost his mom to breast cancer while in high school), players wore pink wristbands and ribbons on this day to raise breast cancer awareness. It was also the second perfect game in Oakland A's history; the first coming on May 8, 1968, when Jim "Catfish" Hunter beat the Minnesota Twins, 4–0.
- Roy Halladay (PHI):
  - Exactly 20 days later, on May 29, Halladay threw the 20th perfect game in Major League history, defeating the Florida Marlins 1–0. This achievement marked the first time in the modern (post-1900) era that two perfect games were pitched in the same season. In 1880, both Lee Richmond and John Montgomery Ward both hurled a perfect game five days apart. It was also the first perfect game for the Phillies since Jim Bunning's Father's Day perfect game on June 21, 1964, beating the New York Mets, 6–0.
- Armando Galarraga (DET):
  - Galarraga threw what would have been a third perfect game on June 2 against the Cleveland Indians. However, first base umpire Jim Joyce made an errant call on Galarraga's coverage of first base on a flip throw by first baseman Miguel Cabrera, which would have been the final out. "I just cost [Galarraga] a perfect game", Joyce replied. "I thought he beat the throw. I was convinced he beat the throw, until I saw the replay. It was the biggest call of my career. I don't blame them a bit or anything that was said. I would've said it myself if I had been Galarraga. I would've been the first person in my face, and he never said a word to me." The 17,738 fans—as well as players and manager Jim Leyland—argued following the game.

===== No-hitters =====
- Ubaldo Jiménez (COL):
  - Threw the first no-hitter in the Rockies 18-year history by blanking the Atlanta Braves 4–0 on April 17. It was also his first career no-hitter and the first no-hitter of the season.
- Edwin Jackson (CWS)/(AZ):
  - Threw a no-hitter as a member of the Arizona Diamondbacks against the Tampa Bay Rays in a 1–0 win on June 25. It was the second no-hitter in Diamondbacks history and his first in his career. The only other pitcher to have a no-hit game was Randy Johnson against Atlanta, and that was a perfect game in 2004.
  - Jackson was traded to the Chicago White Sox on July 30.
- Matt Garza (TB):
  - Threw the franchise's first no-hitter facing the minimum 27 batters (surrendering a walk in the 2nd inning) beating the Detroit Tigers 5–0 on July 26.

===== Postseason no-hitter =====
- Roy Halladay (PHI):
  - Halladay twirled the first postseason no-hitter since Don Larsen's perfect game in the fifth game of the 1956 World Series leading the Phillies to a 4–0 win in the first game of the 2010 National League Division Series at Citizens Bank Park over the Cincinnati Reds. Halladay walked Jay Bruce in the fifth inning as the only blemish on the record. Halladay threw 104 pitches, 74 of them for strikes, striking out eight in becoming the first pitcher to have two no-hit games in the same calendar year with one of them occurring in the postseason.

===== Other accomplishments =====
- Roy Halladay (PHI):
  - Recorded his 150th career victory with a 2–1 complete-game victory over the Houston Astros on April 11. Halladay became the 240th player to reach this mark, and also recorded his 50th career complete game.
- Bobby Jenks (CWS):
  - Recorded his 150th career save closing out a win against the Seattle Mariners on April 25. Jenks became the 69th player to reach this mark.
- Roy Oswalt (PHI)/(HOU):
  - Recorded his 1500th career strikeout as a member of the Houston Astros against the Cincinnati Reds on April 29. Bronson Arroyo was the victim as he struck out in the 4th inning. Oswalt became the 171st player to reach this mark.
  - Oswalt was traded to the Philadelphia Phillies on July 29.
  - Recorded his 150th career victory with a 9–1 victory against the Washington Nationals on September 17. He became the 245th player to reach this mark.
- Tim Hudson (ATL):
  - Recorded his 150th career victory with 6.2 innings of work in a 10–1 victory against the Houston Astros on May 1. Hudson became the 241st player to reach this mark.
  - Recorded his 1500th career strikeout against the Florida Marlins on August 28. Logan Morrison was the victim as he struck out in the 1st inning. He became the 175th to reach this mark.
- A. J. Burnett (NYY):
  - Recorded his 1500th career strikeout against the Baltimore Orioles on May 4. Luke Scott was the victim as he struck out in the 4th inning. Burnett became the 172nd player to reach this mark.
- Jamie Moyer (PHI):
  - Became the oldest pitcher to pitch a complete-game shutout in Major League history when at the age of 47 years, 170 days, he beat the Atlanta Braves, 7–0 on May 7 at Citizens Bank Park. Phil Niekro at age 46 years, 188 days was the oldest pitcher to do that beforehand, while Satchel Paige at age 46 years, 75 days, was the oldest non-knuckleball throwing pitcher to accomplish the feat for the St. Louis Browns in 1952. Moyer also became the first pitcher to pitch complete-game shutouts in four decades (1980s, 1990s, 2000s, 2010s).
  - On June 22, allowed his record-tying 505th home run in the 2nd inning to Russell Branyan of the Cleveland Indians. Moyer ties the record that was held by Robin Roberts. In his next start five days later, Moyer allowed his Major League record-breaking 506th career home run in the 3rd inning to Vernon Wells of the Toronto Blue Jays.
- Jeff Weaver (LAD):
  - Recorded his 100th career victory in a 6–5 victory over the Colorado Rockies on May 7. Weaver pitched one-third of an inning to get the victory. Weaver became the 572nd player to reach this mark.
- Tim Wakefield (BOS):
  - Recorded his 2000th career strikeout against the Toronto Blue Jays on May 12. Vernon Wells was the victim as he struck out in the 4th inning. Wakefield became the 64th pitcher to reach this mark.
- Francisco Rodríguez (NYM):
  - Recorded his 250th career save by closing out a 5–3 victory against the New York Yankees on May 22. Rodriguez became the 29th player to reach this mark.
- Trevor Hoffman (MIL):
  - Pitched in his 1000th career game on May 23 against the Minnesota Twins. Hoffman worked the 8th inning in the 4–3 victory. Hoffman became the 14th pitcher to reach this mark.
  - Recorded his 600th career save by closing out a 4–2 victory against the St. Louis Cardinals on September 7. He became the 1st player to reach this mark.
- Joakim Soria (KC):
  - Recorded his 100th career save by closing out a win against the Texas Rangers on May 26. Soria became the 121st player to reach this mark.
- Brian Wilson (SF):
  - Recorded his 100th career save by closing out a win against the Pittsburgh Pirates on June 4. Wilson became the 122nd player to reach this mark.
- Stephen Strasburg (WSH):
  - On June 8, becomes the first player in Major League history with at least 11 strikeouts and no walks in a major league debut in a 5–2 victory against the Pittsburgh Pirates. Strasburg, who worked seven innings, fell one strikeout short for most strikeouts in a major league debut since 1920 held by J. R. Richard and Karl Spooner.
  - On June 18, Strasburg set another record by recording a total of 32 strikeouts in his first three professional starts by striking out 10 Chicago White Sox and broke the record held by Richard.
  - In his next start (June 23), Strasburg set another record by recording a total of 41 strikeouts in his first four professional starts. He struck out nine Kansas City Royals and broke the record of 40 that Herb Score set in his first four starts in 1955 as a member of the Cleveland Indians.
- Kevin Gregg (TOR):
  - Recorded his 100th career save by closing out a win against the Tampa Bay Rays on June 10. Gregg becomes the 123rd player to reach this mark.
- Jake Peavy (CWS):
  - Recorded his 100th career victory in a 10–5 victory over the Chicago Cubs on June 11. Peavy became the 573rd player to reach this mark.
- Derek Lowe (ATL):
  - Recorded his 150th career victory in a 6–4 victory over the Kansas City Royals on June 18. Lowe became the 242nd player to reach this mark.
  - Recorded his 1500th career strikeout against the Washington Nationals on September 13. Roger Bernadina was the victim as he struck out in the 4th inning. He became the 177th player to reach this mark.
- Brad Lidge (PHI):
  - Recorded his 200th career save by closing out a win against the Cleveland Indians on June 22. Lidge became the 40th player to reach this mark.
- Billy Wagner (ATL):
  - Recorded his 400th career save by closing out a win against the Detroit Tigers on June 25. Wagner, who struck out the side, became the 5th player to reach this mark.
- Vicente Padilla (LAD):
  - Recorded his 100th career victory in an 8–2 victory over the San Francisco Giants on June 30. Padilla became the 574th player to reach this mark.
- Octavio Dotel (COL)/(LAD)/(PIT):
  - While a member of the Pittsburgh Pirates, Dotel recorded his 100th career save by closing out a win against the Philadelphia Phillies on July 1, becoming the 124th player to reach this mark.
  - Dotel was traded to the Los Angeles Dodgers on July 31.
  - Dotel was traded to the Colorado Rockies on September 18.
- Javier Vázquez (NYY):
  - Recorded his 150th career victory in a 10–6 victory over the Los Angeles Angels on July 21. Vazquez became the 243rd player to reach this mark.
- Ryan Dempster (CHC):
  - Recorded his 1500th career strikeout against the St. Louis Cardinals on July 25. Jon Jay was the victim as he struck out in the 6th inning. Dempster became the 173rd player to reach this mark.
  - Recorded his 100th career victory in a 1–0 victory over the Milwaukee Brewers on September 11. He became the 577th player to reach this mark.
- Cliff Lee (TEX)/(SEA):
  - Recorded his 100th career victory in a 5–1 victory over the Oakland Athletics on August 6. Lee became the 575th player to reach this mark.
- CC Sabathia (NYY):
  - Recorded his 150th career victory in a 5–2 victory over the Boston Red Sox on August 7. Sabathia became the 244th player to reach this mark.
- David Price (TB):
  - Set the Rays team record by recording his 15th victory of the season by defeating the Detroit Tigers on August 9. Price broke the previous record of 14 wins that was shared with James Shields (2008), Edwin Jackson (2008) and Rolando Arrojo (1998).
- Mariano Rivera (NYY):
  - Recorded his 550th career save by closing out a win against the Texas Rangers on August 11. Rivera became the 2nd player to reach this mark.
- Kerry Wood (NYY)/(CLE):
  - Recorded his 1500th career strikeout against the Detroit Tigers on August 18, this after being traded to the Yankees by the Cleveland Indians on July 31. Ramon Santiago was the victim as he struck out in the 7th inning. Wood became the 174th player to reach this mark.
- Bronson Arroyo (CIN):
  - Recorded his 100th career victory in a 5–2 victory over the Los Angeles Dodgers on August 22. Arroyo became the 576th player to reach this mark.
- Félix Hernández (SEA):
  - Became the fourth-youngest pitcher in Major League history to reach 1000 career strikeouts on August 25. Hernandez's victim was David Ortiz. Only Bob Feller, Bert Blyleven and Dwight Gooden were younger than Hernandez when they reached this mark.
- Matt Capps (MIN)/(WSH):
  - Recorded his 100th career save by closing out a win against the Detroit Tigers on August 31. Capps became the 125th player to reach this mark.
- Randy Wolf (MIL):
  - Recorded his 1500th career strikeout on September 5 against the Philadelphia Phillies. Jayson Werth was the victim as he struck out in the 3rd inning. Wolf became the 176th player to reach this mark.
- Ubaldo Jiménez (COL):
  - Set the Rockies team record by recording his 18th victory of the season by defeating the Cincinnati Reds on September 6. Jimenez broke the previous record of 17 wins that was shared with Jeff Francis (2007), Pedro Astacio (1999) and Kevin Ritz (1996).
- Mat Latos (SD):
  - Set a record with his 15th straight start with five or more innings pitched and two or fewer runs allowed by defeating the Los Angeles Dodgers on September 7. Latos broke the record of 14 straight starts held by Greg Maddux (1993–94) and Mike Scott (1986).
- Javier Vázquez (NYY):
  - Tied a Major League record by becoming the eighth pitcher to hit three consecutive batters by pitch, the first since 2004, in a game against the Tampa Bay Rays on September 23.

=== Miscellaneous ===
- Starlin Castro (CHC):
  - Is the first player in Major League history born in the 1990s. He made his debut on May 7 against the Cincinnati Reds.
- The annual Civil Rights Game took place on May 15 at Great American Ball Park in Cincinnati with the host Cincinnati Reds defeating the NL Central rival St. Louis Cardinals 4–3.
- The Chicago Cubs played their 20,000th game in their history on June 26, but lost to their crosstown rivals the Chicago White Sox, 3–2 at U.S. Cellular Field. Their record was 10,197–9,643 (with 160 tied games).
- The Atlanta Braves played their 20,000th game in their history on August 6, having started in 1876 in Boston, transferring operations to Milwaukee in 1953 and coming to Atlanta in 1966, losing in 11 innings, 3–2 to the San Francisco Giants at Turner Field. Their record was 9,916–9,930 (with 154 tied games).
- The Pittsburgh Pirates extended a dubious record; 2010 was their 18th consecutive losing season, a record for North American major professional sports teams. The Pirates matched the 1963 New York Mets for the worst road record in a 162-game season at 17–64.
- The Arizona Diamondbacks set the single-season record for team strikeouts by striking out for the 1,400th time against the Colorado Rockies on September 21. Adam LaRoche was the strikeout victim that broke the record of the 2001 Milwaukee Brewers. The Diamondbacks finished the season striking out 1529 times.
- Bobby Cox, manager of the Atlanta Braves, became the fourth manager in Major League history to win 2500 games as the Braves defeated the Washington Nationals on September 25. He joins Connie Mack, John McGraw and Tony La Russa as the only managers to reach this milestone. Cox has managed the Braves for 25 years (1978–1981, 1990–2010) and the Toronto Blue Jays (1982–1985) for four years leading them to a Major League record of 16 playoff appearances, as well as the Braves' only World Series title in Atlanta (the franchise's first two titles came in Boston and Milwaukee respectively). On September 29, Cox won his 90th game in a season for the 15th time in his career as a manager. This is tied for the second-most in Major League history with Joe McCarthy and is one behind the record held by John McGraw.
- The Kansas City Royals recorded their 5000th home run in franchise history on September 26. Mike Avilés hit the home run in the 5th inning against the Cleveland Indians.
- The San Francisco Giants established a single-season franchise record for strikeouts with 1306 after the Arizona Diamondbacks struck out 14 times on September 30. The Giants finished the season with 1331 strikeouts.
- The Toronto Blue Jays became the fourth team in Major League history to hit 250 home runs in a season. They joined the 1997 Seattle Mariners (264), the 2005 Texas Rangers (260) and the 1996 Baltimore Orioles (257) on September 30. The Blue Jays finished the season with 257 home runs.
- The Boston Red Sox extended their Fenway Park sellout streak to 631 games since beginning on May 15, 2003.
- The Texas Rangers won their first-ever franchise postseason game at home, postseason series, first American League Pennant, and first World Series appearance.

== Awards and honors ==
=== Regular season ===
Baseball Writers' Association of America Awards
BBWAA Award	National League	American League
Rookie of the Year	Buster Posey (SFG)	Neftalí Feliz (TEX)
Cy Young Award	Roy Halladay (PHI)	Félix Hernández (SEA)
Manager of the Year	Bud Black (SDP)	Ron Gardenhire (MIN)
Most Valuable Player	Joey Votto (CIN)	Josh Hamilton (TEX)
Gold Glove Awards
Position	National League	American League
Pitcher	Bronson Arroyo (CIN)	Mark Buehrle (CWS)
Catcher	Yadier Molina (STL)	Joe Mauer (MIN)
1st Base	Albert Pujols (STL)	Mark Teixeira (NYY)
2nd Base	Brandon Phillips (CIN)	Robinson Canó (NYY)
3rd Base	Scott Rolen (CIN)	Evan Longoria (TB)
Shortstop	Troy Tulowitzki (COL)	Derek Jeter (NYY)
Outfield	Carlos González (COL)	Ichiro Suzuki (SEA)
Outfield	Michael Bourn (HOU)	Carl Crawford (TB)
Outfield	Shane Victorino (PHI)	Franklin Gutiérrez (SEA)
Silver Slugger Awards
Position	National League	American League
Pitcher/Designated Hitter	Yovani Gallardo (MIL)	Vladimir Guerrero (TEX)
Catcher	Brian McCann (ATL)	Joe Mauer (MIN)
1st Base	Albert Pujols (STL)	Miguel Cabrera (DET)
2nd Base	Dan Uggla (FLA)	Robinson Canó (NYY)
3rd Base	Ryan Zimmerman (WSH)	Adrián Beltré (BOS)
Shortstop	Troy Tulowitzki (COL)	Alexei Ramírez (CWS)
Outfield	Carlos González (COL)	Josh Hamilton (TEX)
Outfield	Ryan Braun (MIL)	Carl Crawford (TB)
Outfield	Matt Holliday (STL)	José Bautista (TOR)

==== Player of the Month ====
Month	American League	National League
April	Robinson Canó	Kelly Johnson
May	David Ortiz	Troy Glaus
June	Josh Hamilton	David Wright
July	Delmon Young; José Bautista (tie)	Buster Posey
August	José Bautista	Albert Pujols
September	Alex Rodriguez	Troy Tulowitzki

==== Pitcher of the Month ====
Month	American League	National League
April	Francisco Liriano	Ubaldo Jiménez
May	Jon Lester	Ubaldo Jiménez
June	Cliff Lee	Josh Johnson
July	Gavin Floyd	Roy Halladay
August	Clay Buchholz	Tim Hudson
September	David Price	Derek Lowe

==== Rookie of the Month ====
Month	American League	National League
April	Austin Jackson	Jason Heyward
May	Brennan Boesch	Jason Heyward
June	Brennan Boesch	Gaby Sánchez
July	Wade Davis	Buster Posey
August	Brian Matusz	Daniel Hudson
September	Neftalí Feliz	Pedro Alvarez

=== Other awards ===
- Comeback Players of the Year: Francisco Liriano (MIN, American); Tim Hudson (ATL, National)
- Hank Aaron Award: José Bautista (TOR, American); Joey Votto (CIN, National)
- Roberto Clemente Award (Humanitarian): Tim Wakefield (BOS)
- Delivery Man of the Year (Best Reliever): Heath Bell (SD)
- Clutch Performer of the Year: Roy Halladay (PHI)

== Home field attendance & payroll ==
Team Name	Wins	%±	Home attendance	%±	Per Game	Est. Payroll	%±
Philadelphia Phillies	97	4.3%	3,777,322	4.9%	44,968	$141,928,379	22.9%
New York Yankees	95	-7.8%	3,765,807	1.2%	46,491	$210,733,389	0.2%
Los Angeles Dodgers	80	-15.8%	3,562,320	-5.3%	43,979	$95,358,016	-6.6%
St. Louis Cardinals	86	-5.5%	3,301,218	-1.3%	40,756	$93,540,751	2.9%
Los Angeles Angels of Anaheim	80	-17.5%	3,250,814	0.3%	40,134	$104,963,866	-11.2%
Minnesota Twins	94	8.0%	3,223,640	33.4%	39,798	$97,559,166	43.9%
Chicago Cubs	75	-9.6%	3,062,973	-3.3%	37,814	$146,609,002	5.0%
Boston Red Sox	89	-6.3%	3,046,445	-0.5%	37,610	$164,507,333	31.1%
San Francisco Giants	92	4.5%	3,037,443	6.1%	37,499	$98,641,333	7.3%
Colorado Rockies	83	-9.8%	2,875,245	7.9%	35,497	$90,677,000	14.4%
Milwaukee Brewers	77	-3.8%	2,776,531	-8.6%	34,278	$81,108,278	-0.3%
New York Mets	79	12.9%	2,559,738	-19.2%	31,602	$134,422,942	-11.6%
Atlanta Braves	91	5.8%	2,510,119	5.8%	30,989	$84,423,666	-15.2%
Texas Rangers	90	3.4%	2,505,171	16.2%	30,928	$56,474,374	-29.2%
Detroit Tigers	81	-5.8%	2,461,237	-4.1%	30,386	$124,039,928	3.8%
Houston Astros	76	2.7%	2,331,490	-7.5%	28,784	$93,216,000	-11.9%
Chicago White Sox	88	11.4%	2,194,378	-3.9%	27,091	$107,195,000	6.0%
San Diego Padres	90	20.0%	2,131,774	11.1%	26,318	$37,799,300	-25.8%
Seattle Mariners	61	-28.2%	2,085,630	-5.0%	25,749	$86,510,000	-13.6%
Cincinnati Reds	91	16.7%	2,060,550	17.9%	25,439	$75,321,542	-4.6%
Arizona Diamondbacks	65	-7.1%	2,056,697	-3.4%	25,391	$61,368,166	-19.2%
Tampa Bay Rays	96	14.3%	1,864,999	-0.5%	23,025	$71,923,471	6.9%
Washington Nationals	69	16.9%	1,828,066	0.6%	22,569	$67,701,000	5.2%
Baltimore Orioles	66	3.1%	1,733,019	-9.1%	21,395	$81,612,500	16.7%
Kansas City Royals	67	3.1%	1,615,327	-10.2%	19,942	$73,105,210	-4.8%
Pittsburgh Pirates	57	-8.1%	1,613,399	2.3%	19,919	$37,443,000	-27.9%
Florida Marlins	80	-8.0%	1,524,894	4.2%	18,826	$57,454,719	43.5%
Toronto Blue Jays	85	13.3%	1,495,482	-20.3%	19,173	$62,734,000	-25.3%
Oakland Athletics	81	8.0%	1,418,391	0.7%	17,511	$57,904,900	-12.2%
Cleveland Indians	69	6.2%	1,391,644	-21.2%	17,181	$61,203,966	-28.2%

== New stadium ==
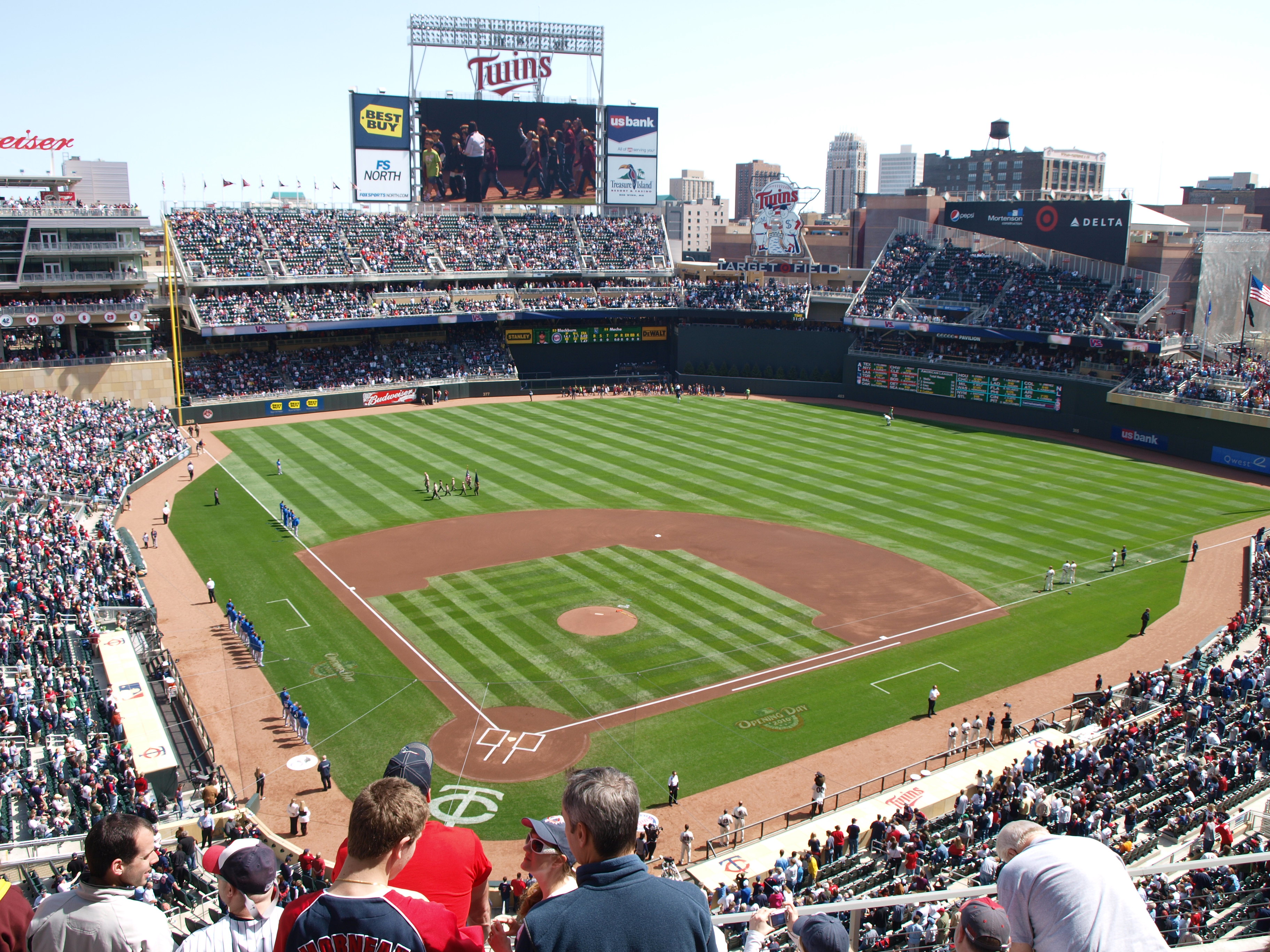
Target Field celebrated the return of outdoor Major League Baseball to Minnesota for the first time since September 30, 1981.

The Minnesota Twins inaugurated Target Field, their new 39,504-seat home field, in an exhibition game on April 2 against the St. Louis Cardinals (the Twins lost 8–4). On April 12, the Twins played their first regular season game in their new ballpark with a 5–2 win over the Boston Red Sox. The team moved from the Hubert H. Humphrey Metrodome, which they shared with the Minnesota Vikings since the stadium opened in 1982 and also with the University of Minnesota football program until the Golden Gophers returned to their campus and opened TCF Bank Stadium in September 2009. The Twins last played outdoor baseball at home in 1981 when Metropolitan Stadium (where the Mall of America now stands) closed.

Target Field is also the first stadium to have been built specifically for the Twins since their arrival in the Twin Cities in 1961, and the first stadium to have been built specifically for the franchise since Griffith Stadium was built for the original Washington Nationals in 1911. Also, the 2010 season was the first since 1936 in which the Twins/Senators franchise did not share its stadium with an NFL team.

== Ownership change ==
The Texas Rangers were sold at an auction in U.S. Bankruptcy Court on August 5 to a group led by Chuck Greenberg and Hall of Famer Nolan Ryan from former owner Tom Hicks. The ownership change was approved by MLB owners on August 12.

== Broadcasting ==
=== Television ===
The 2010 season marked the first full season in the US for baseball games to be telecast in the digital format. The national telecast breakdown is as follows, along with the maximum number of appearances per team:

- FOX: Saturday afternoon Game of the Week on a regional basis; nine appearances per team. In addition, the network will broadcast the All-Star Game (which was also broadcast in 3-D), NLCS, and World Series. The network starts their telecasts on Saturdays at 4 PM US ET/1 PM US PT, except for three dates (April 10, May 1 and 8) due to NASCAR coverage, when those games started at 3 PM ET/12 noon PT. Two prime time dates were on the schedule on both May 22 and June 26, both starting at 7 PM ET/4 PM PT. Fox Sports en Español holds Spanish broadcast rights to the World Series.
- ESPN/ESPN2: Sunday Night Baseball on a weekly basis; five appearances per team. In addition, there are games on Monday and Wednesday nights (with the Monday games moving to either Wednesday nights to form a doubleheader or Friday nights when the 2010 NFL season begins), Opening Day games on April 5, and the Home Run Derby on July 12, which was also broadcast on ESPN 3D. ESPN Deportes holds Spanish rights to the Sunday night package.
- TBS: Sunday afternoon games starting on April 11; 13 appearances per team. In addition, the network will carry the announcement of the All-Star Teams in the National and American Leagues on July 4 as well as the Division Series and the ALCS as per the alternating contract with FOX. Blackout rules will again apply here as Headline News will be broadcast in the teams' markets during the regular season.
- MLB Network: The network will again air a weekly Thursday Night Game of the Week and Saturday Night Game of the Week, and for the first time, selected afternoon games. Thursday Night games are produced in-house, while Saturday Night games and midweek day games (except for the Civil Rights Game, May 22 and June 26) will usually come off the home team's video production. Blackouts will again apply here, as viewers in the competing team's markets will telecast an alternate game off the home team feed of selected teams. In addition, holiday games on Memorial Day (May 31) and day games on July 5 and in addition, commencing on September 5 (Labor Day), expanded coverage of the pennant races will be taking place with additional games broadcast.

In Canada, Toronto Blue Jays games will be televised on Rogers Sportsnet and Rogers Sportsnet One. RSN also holds the Canadian rights to air the Fox and ESPN/ESPN2 games if they do not conflict with Blue Jays games, as well as the All-Star Game and the entire postseason. Starting May 16, TSN2 holds rights to the ESPN Sunday Night Baseball telecasts.

In Australia free to air channel One HD shows up to 5 regular season games live per week (no postseason coverage), and European channel ESPN America broadcasts games as well.

=== Radio ===
ESPN Radio will again serve as MLB's national radio network, broadcasting Sunday Night Baseball as well as selected Saturday and holiday games during the regular season, the Home Run Derby and All-Star Game, and all postseason series. ESPN Deportes Radio holds the Spanish language rights to the Fall Classic.

== Uniforms, patches, and logo changes ==
=== Uniforms ===
==== New uniforms and uniform changes ====
- The Florida Marlins, as part of the team's rebranding to the Miami Marlins as part of their preparation for the 2012 opening of their new ballpark, has dropped "Florida" from their road uniforms that had been with the team since its inception, using the team name instead.
- The Minnesota Twins became the first team to unveil changes for the season. On November 16, 2009, the team unveiled a new logo with a revamped wordmark, and introduced throwback alternates based on their 1961 home uniforms, which were worn on Opening Day and on Saturdays. The Twins also unveiled their first road uniform change since 1987, dropping the pinstripes, and changing to a script "Minnesota" with lettering and numbering in navy with white and red trim. The new wordmark also appears on a revamped logo, with a baseball design and the words "Minnesota Twins Baseball Club" incorporated onto a navy circle.
- The Milwaukee Brewers debuted a road alternate jersey with "Milwaukee" on the front, marking the first time the city name will appear on a road jersey since 1999.
- The New York Mets introduced an alternate pinstripe home uniform for the 2010 season. The new uniforms are cream-colored instead of white, and are based on the original Mets uniform, when the team debuted in 1962. The Mets continue to wear their non-pinstriped white uniforms and their black alternate jerseys at Citi Field as well.
- The San Francisco Giants unveiled an orange alternate jersey for 2010 worn on "Orange Friday" games at home. The jersey will have the Giants name in black with a white outline along with a two-stripe black trim around the neck and sleeves. The team also changed their socks, adding three orange stripes to the black stockings already worn (while not wearing their "pajama pants.")
- The Tampa Bay Rays added a long-rumored light blue alternate jersey for the 2010 season, to be worn on Sundays at home. In June, the team added two mid-calf white/light blue/white stripes to their navy blue socks.
- The New York Yankees changed the MLB logo used on jerseys, apparel and equipment from the standard blue white and red to blue white and gray. The last time the Yankees used gray white and blue MLB logos was in 1996 for a short time.

==== Retired numbers ====
- The San Francisco Giants retired the #20 worn by Monte Irvin, one of the first African-American pioneers in Major League Baseball, on June 26 prior to their game against the Boston Red Sox at AT&T Park. Irvin, with Hank Thompson, were the first black players to play for the franchise while the team was based in New York in 1949.
- The St. Louis Cardinals retired the #24 made famous by manager Whitey Herzog on Saturday, July 31 before their game against the Pittsburgh Pirates.
- The Atlanta Braves retired Tom Glavine's #47 on August 6 prior to their 20,000th game in franchise history against the San Francisco Giants. Glavine formally retired in February 2010 and became a special assistant and part-time broadcaster.
- The Arizona Diamondbacks honored Luis Gonzalez, one of the franchise's most popular players, as his #20 was formally retired prior to the game on August 7 against the San Diego Padres. "Gonzo" was responsible for the walk-off single in the seventh game of the 2001 World Series off Mariano Rivera to clinch the franchise's first – and thus far, only – World Championship.
- The Chicago White Sox retired Frank Thomas' #35 on August 29 before their game against the New York Yankees. "The Big Hurt" officially retired as a White Sox member on February 12. The Pale Hose also unretired the #11 made famous by Luis Aparicio and allowed Omar Vizquel to wear it this season. This is due to the fact that manager Ozzie Guillén already wears number 13, which Vizquel has worn through his career in tribute to Dave Concepción.

==== Throwbacks ====
- To celebrate their 40th Anniversary season in Milwaukee, the Brewers wore replicas of their previous uniforms during three home games, first donning their 1972 uniforms on May 14 versus the Philadelphia Phillies, who wore replicas of their powder blue outfits that night; their 1982 uniforms against the Seattle Mariners on June 25, who donned their pullovers from that season, and their 1998 uniforms against the Washington Nationals on July 23. They also wore Milwaukee Bears uniforms on May 30 against the New York Mets as part of Negro League Tribute Night. The Mets wore replicas of the New York Cubans' road outfits.
- The Houston Astros, in honor of their 45th year as the Astros, wore their 1965 jerseys on April 10 against the Phillies, who also wore replicas of their 1965 uniforms on that date. In addition, members of the ground crew donned replicas of the "spacesuits" worn by groundskeepers at the Astrodome and several female members were attired in replicas of the Astros' usherettes uniform. The team wore their "Rainbow Shoulders" uniform worn from 1985 through 1995 against the Cincinnati Reds July 24 as well.
- For the Civil Rights Game May 15, the Cincinnati Reds and St. Louis Cardinals wore replicas of their uniforms from 1954, the year in which both teams fielded their first black players.
- The San Diego Padres held "Throwback Thursdays", featuring the uniforms worn in both 1978, when the team recorded their first winning record, and from 1984, when the team won their first pennant in the National League. Several teams – notably the Atlanta Braves and the Pittsburgh Pirates – joined in by wearing replicas from that season.
- The Oakland Athletics and the Pittsburgh Pirates wore 1970's uniforms in Oakland on June 26. The Bucs wearing the 1979 championship season black ensemble, while the A's wore an all gold uniform from 1974. Also that day, the Baltimore Orioles celebrated the 40th Anniversary of their 1970 World Series triumph wearing replicas of the uniforms as the Nationals donned the second coming of the Washington Senators uniforms from that season.
- The Orioles wore an all-orange uniform on August 13 at the Tampa Bay Rays, who donned uniforms of the Tampa Tarpons from that 1970 season as well. Orioles skipper Buck Showalter criticized the uniforms, and said they will never wear them again for a turn back the clock game.
- The Nationals and Cleveland Indians wore throwback uniforms on June 12 to commemorate each city's first World Series wins in 1920 and 1924, respectively (the Washington team were then the American League Washington Senators franchise). The Indians also wore black armbands to commemorate Ray Chapman's passing, also taking place 90 years ago. Also on June 12, the Pirates and Detroit Tigers played the annual Negro leagues tribute game at Comerica Park. The hosts wore the 1920s Detroit Stars uniforms, while the Pirates donned the 1931 road colors of the Pittsburgh Crawfords. The Buccos wore the Crawfords' home uniforms on their Negro League Tribute Night August 21 against the Mets, who wore a second New York Cubans road outfit. The Kansas City Royals' Negro League Tribute game was held on July 31 as the Royals donned the 1949 Kansas City Monarchs uniforms, while the Orioles wore 1940s Baltimore Elite Giants outfits.

=== Patches ===
==== Anniversaries ====
- The Houston Astros wore a patch commemorating their 45th season since changing their name from the Houston Colt .45s. The patch featured the "tequila sunrise" stripes from the team's Rainbow Guts uniforms as its background.
- The Los Angeles Angels of Anaheim wore a patch for hosting the All-Star Game.
- The Los Angeles Dodgers had a patch commemorating 55 years since winning their first World Series when the franchise was located in Brooklyn, New York. The patch features "1st World Championship" in red lettering above an oval, the center has the year (1955) and the Dodgers' logo with the Brooklyn Bridge shadowing both sides, and underneath has "55 since '55" in red/blue/red lettering.
- The Milwaukee Brewers are wearing a patch commemorating their 40th season in Milwaukee.
- The Minnesota Twins had two patches, one commemorating their 50th season in Minnesota on their road uniforms, and another honoring their new stadium on their home uniforms.

==== Memorials ====
- Following the death of Colorado Rockies' president Keli McGregor on April 20, the team started wearing a patch with his initials ("KSM") on their uniforms.
- On May 5, the day after the death of longtime Detroit Tigers radio broadcaster Ernie Harwell, the Tigers began wearing a patch on the right sleeve in his memory, inscribed with the broadcaster's initials.
- The Philadelphia Phillies wore a patch with the number "36" on their right sleeve, honoring Hall of Fame pitcher Robin Roberts, who died on May 6.
- After the passing of former National League umpire John Kibler, all MLB umpires have worn a black square patch with his initials ("JK") in white for a short time. The same item came about when Satch Davidson passed on in August with a small square patch with the initials "SD".
- Following the passing of long-time public address announcer Bob Sheppard and owner George Steinbrenner, the New York Yankees wore a black armband in memory of both men at the All-Star Game. Starting with their series at home against Tampa Bay, the team would have two patches, one with the initials "GMS" on their left chest for Mr. Steinbrenner, and on the left sleeve, a patch honoring Mr. Sheppard. When Ralph Houk died July 21, the team added a black armband on their left sleeve.
- The Pittsburgh Pirates honored former general manager Joe L. Brown following his death with his initials in yellow on a black circle.

=== Caps ===
- All teams have new batting practice/spring training caps for the season.
- The Kansas City Royals unveiled a new powder blue alternate cap, which will be worn with their powder blue alternate jersey.
- The San Francisco Giants introduced a new alternate cap, featuring the traditional SF monogram with an orange bill to be worn on Sundays
- All teams again donned a special cap with the team cap logo in a stars-and-stripes motif (or in the case of the Toronto Blue Jays, a maple leaf motif) on Memorial Day, July 4 (July 1 – Canada Day – for the Blue Jays) and September 11 (June 23 in the case of the Blue Jays, as Canada remembers all those who died in acts of terrorism on that day), which will be white with either a red or blue bill.
- The Tampa Bay Rays introduced caps with a plaid brim for a batting practice hat in late September, then wore the hats for one game, the last home game of the regular season against the Baltimore Orioles.
- The Boston Red Sox dropped the alternate 'hanging socks' cap in favor of the more popular 'B' cap.

== Retirements ==
- Two members of the Atlanta Braves retired. Manager Bobby Cox announced his intentions of ending his career at the conclusion of the season, which followed their elimination by the San Francisco Giants in the NLDS in four games, while relief pitcher Billy Wagner announced on May 5 that the 2010 season would be his last as an active player. Wagner's career ended with an injury during Game 2 against the Giants.
- Ken Griffey Jr. retired from baseball on June 2, finishing his career as a member of the Seattle Mariners.
- Cito Gaston, the manager of the Toronto Blue Jays, retired after the season, finishing his second term as manager of the club.
- Longtime umpire Jerry Crawford hung up his chest protector following the Twins-Yankees Division Series. Starting out in the National League before umpiring crews were merged in 2000, Crawford, whose father worked as a National League umpire and brother is a referee in the NBA, worked five World Series – the most notable as the home plate umpire in Game One of the 1988 Fall Classic, where Kirk Gibson hit his pinch-hit walk-off home run – two All-Star Games, six League Division Series and a record 12 League Championship Series, retired due to health concerns.
- Mike Lowell, of the Boston Red Sox, retired after 13 seasons.
- Brad Ausmus, of the Los Angeles Dodgers, retired after 18 seasons.
- Mike Redmond, of the Cleveland Indians, retired after 13 seasons.

== Venue changes ==
- Due to the 2010 G-20 Toronto Summit, the Toronto Blue Jays along with Major League Baseball decided to hold their three-game interleague series with the Philadelphia Phillies at Citizens Bank Park rather than at Rogers Centre on June 25 through 27 as originally planned. This series was played under American League rules with a Designated Hitter and the Blue Jays as the home team for both scoring and statistical purposes. It was the first time the Designated Hitter rule was used in a National League ballpark (other than exhibition games and all-star games) since Game 2 of the 1984 World Series. As a result, during the 2011 season, the Phillies will visit Rogers Centre on Canada Day weekend (July 1 through 3).

== See also ==
- 2010 Korea Professional Baseball season
- 2010 Nippon Professional Baseball season
