= Jim Wolf =

American baseball umpire (born 1969)

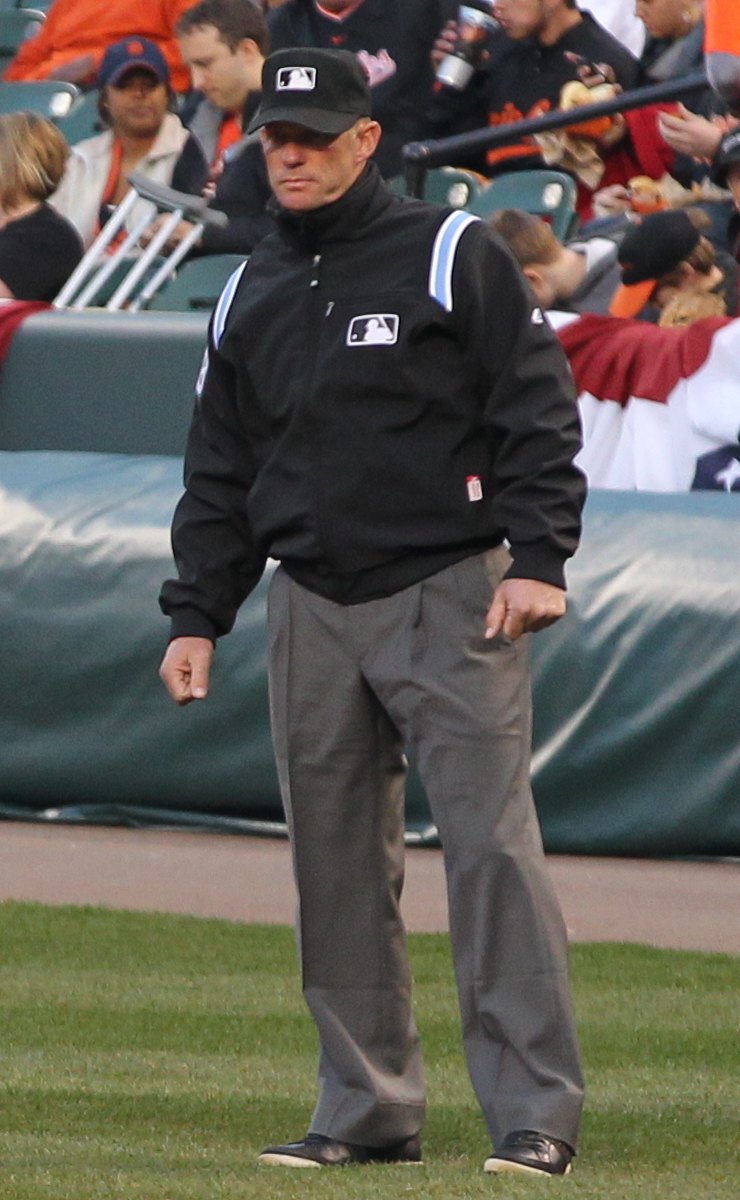
- Wolf in 2011

MLB – No. 28
- Umpire
- Born: July 24, 1969 (age 57); West Hills, California, U.S.

MLB debut
- September 2, 1999

Crew information
- Umpiring crew: D
- Crew members: #64 Alan Porter (crew chief); #28 Jim Wolf; #40 Roberto Ortiz; #9 Alex MacKay

Career highlights and awards
- Special assignments: World Series (2015, 2019, 2026); League Championship Series (2011, 2016, 2017, 2018, 2021); Division Series (2007, 2010, 2014, 2015, 2019, 2023, 2024, 2025, 2026); Wild Card Game (2016, 2018, 2021); All-Star Game (2010); MLB Little League Classic (2023); Home plate umpire for Dallas Braden's perfect game (May 9, 2010)

James Michael Wolf (born July 24, 1969) is an American Major League Baseball umpire. He joined the major league staff in 1999 after working in the Arizona Rookie League, the South Atlantic League, the California League, the Texas League and the Pacific Coast League. He wears uniform number 28.

== Umpiring career ==
On October 4, 2001, Wolf served as third base umpire when Rickey Henderson broke Ty Cobb's runs scored record.

Wolf drew criticism from ESPN announcers after he ejected Chicago Cubs starting pitcher Ted Lilly at the start of a game on June 10, 2007, against the Atlanta Braves. Wolf ruled that Lilly had intentionally thrown at the batter's head, and immediately ejected the pitcher. While such a penalty is uncommon without a formal warning to both teams, such action is permitted by baseball's rules.

On May 9, 2010, Wolf was the home plate umpire for Dallas Braden's perfect game. He was the second base umpire for Armando Galarraga's near-perfect game on June 2, 2010. On July 9, 2011, Wolf was the home plate umpire when Derek Jeter got his 3,000th hit against the Tampa Bay Rays.

Wolf missed several months during the 2013 season due to an apparent back injury. He worked a rehab assignment at Triple-A Charlotte the weekend of July 18–19 en route to a return to the Major Leagues.

On August 2, 2015, Wolf was involved in a series of controversial events in a game between the Toronto Blue Jays and the Kansas City Royals. The controversy was based upon a warning by Wolf to both teams after Blue Jays batter Josh Donaldson was struck by a pitch in the first inning by Edinson Vólquez. The benches were cleared after a number of pitches could have resulted in the Royals' pitcher's ejection, and did not, but a pitch by the Blue Jays' relief pitcher Aaron Sanchez that hit Alcides Escobar immediately resulted in Sanchez being ejected.

Wolf was at third base for Arizona Diamondbacks pitcher Tyler Gilbert’s no hitter against the San Diego Padres on August 14, 2021.

On July 2, 2025, Wolf was the home plate umpire when Clayton Kershaw notched his 3,000th strikeout against the Chicago White Sox.

=== Post-season and All-Star games ===
Wolf has officiated nine Division Series (2007, 2010, 2014, 2015, 2019, 2023, 2024, 2025, 2026), five League Championship Series (2011, 2016, 2017, 2018, 2021), three Wild Card Games (2016, 2018, 2021) and three World Series (2015, 2019, 2026). He has also worked one All-Star Game (2010) and was Replay Official for one All-Star Game (2023).

== Personal life ==
Wolf is married and resides in Ahwatukee, Arizona. His younger brother Randy was a pitcher in the major leagues from 1999 until 2015. To avoid a conflict of interest, he would be removed from assignments if his crew was assigned to work any game where Randy was on either team's roster.

== See also ==
- List of Major League Baseball umpires (disambiguation)
