= Armando Galarraga's near-perfect game =

Baseball event

Armando Galarraga's near-perfect game "28-out perfect game"
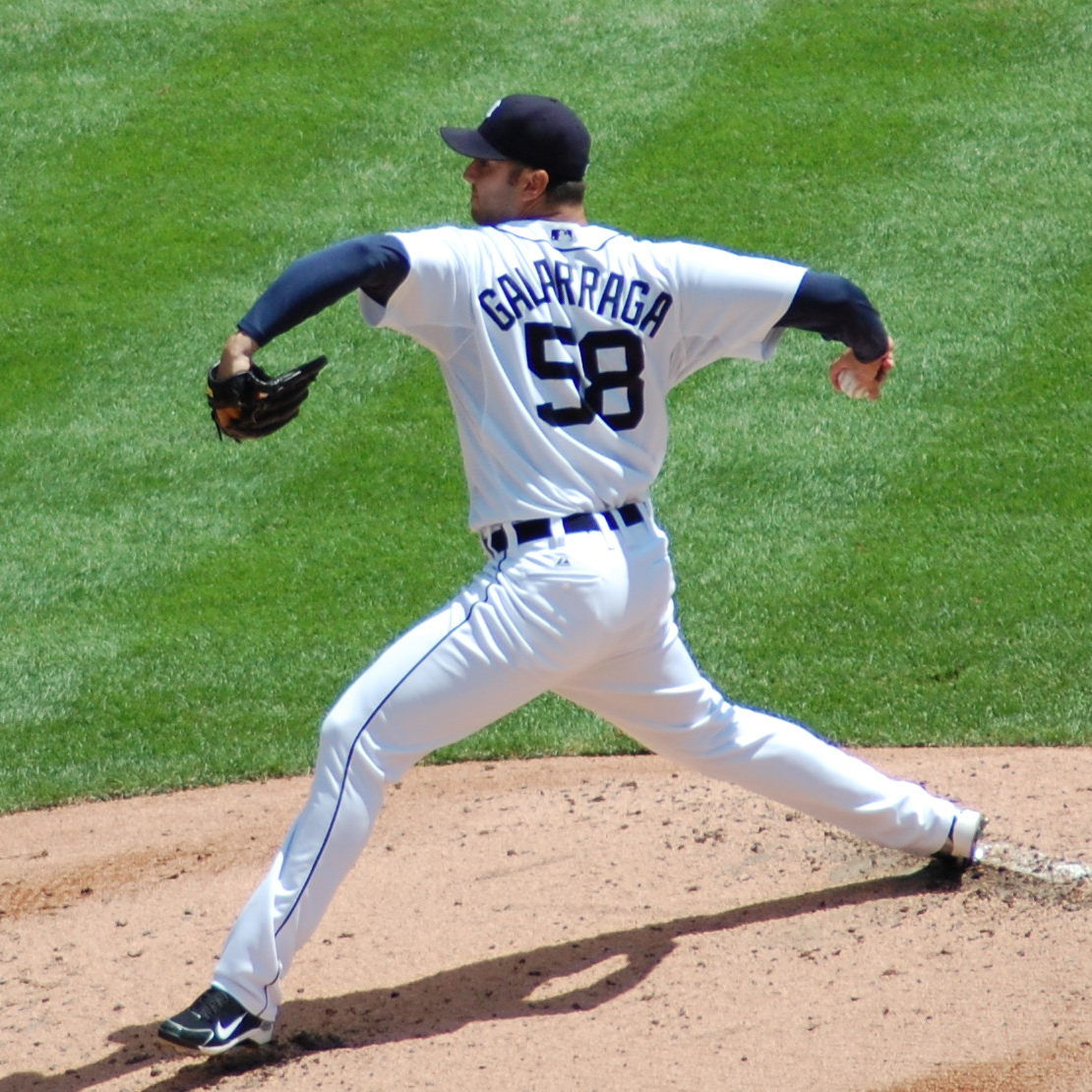
- Galarraga pitching for the Detroit Tigers in 2010
Cleveland Indians	Detroit Tigers
0	3
	1	2	3	4	5	6	7	8	9	R	H	E
Cleveland Indians	0	0	0	0	0	0	0	0	0	0	1	1
Detroit Tigers	0	1	0	0	0	0	0	2	x	3	9	0
- Date: June 2, 2010
- Venue: Comerica Park
- City: Detroit, Michigan, U.S.
- Managers: Manny Acta (Cleveland Indians); Jim Leyland (Detroit Tigers)
- Umpires: HP: Marvin Hudson; 1B: Jim Joyce; 2B: Jim Wolf; 3B: Derryl Cousins
- Attendance: 17,738
- Television: Fox Sports Detroit
- TV announcers: Mario Impemba (play-by-play); Rod Allen (color commentary)
- Radio: WXYT-FM
- Radio announcers: Dan Dickerson (play-by-play); Jim Price (color commentary)

In a Major League Baseball game played on June 2, 2010, at Detroit's Comerica Park, Detroit Tigers pitcher Armando Galarraga nearly became the 21st pitcher in Major League Baseball history to throw a perfect game. Facing the Cleveland Indians, Galarraga retired the first 26 batters he faced. His bid for a perfect game was ruined one out short when first-base umpire Jim Joyce incorrectly ruled that Indians batter Jason Donald reached first base safely on a ground ball. Galarraga instead finished with a one-hit shutout in a 3–0 victory. He faced 28 batters and threw 88 pitches (67 strikes and 21 balls), striking out three. The game is sometimes referred to as the "28-out perfect game", the "almost perfect game", the "extra perfect game", the "imperfect game", or simply the "Galarraga game".

Joyce was tearful and apologetic upon meeting with Galarraga after the game after realizing that he had made an incorrect call. Galarraga was forgiving and understanding of the mistake, telling reporters after the game, "Nobody's perfect." Many others throughout Major League Baseball subsequently voiced their support for Joyce. The sportsmanship demonstrated by Galarraga and Joyce earned them widespread praise for their handling of the incident.

== Game summary ==
Video of the incorrect call at first base showing that Miguel Cabrera's throw to Armando Galarraga beat Jason Donald to the base, but Jim Joyce called Donald safe. Derived from Fox Sports Detroit.

Detroit scored a run on a second-inning solo home run by Miguel Cabrera. Two more runs scored in the eighth inning when Austin Jackson singled, then advanced on an infield hit by Johnny Damon. Jackson and Damon both then scored on a single by Magglio Ordóñez and a throwing error by Shin-Soo Choo.

In the top of the ninth inning, Tigers center fielder Austin Jackson executed an over-the-shoulder catch on the run to retire Cleveland's Mark Grudzielanek for the first out and preserve the perfect game. Jackson's play has been compared to DeWayne Wise's leaping catch at the wall in the ninth inning that preserved Mark Buehrle's perfect game in 2009.

After Mike Redmond grounded out for the second out of the inning, Jason Donald hit a soft ground ball that first baseman Miguel Cabrera ranged far to his right to retrieve. Cabrera threw to Galarraga, who was covering first base. Donald was ruled safe, but video replay showed that Cabrera's throw beat Donald to the bag. Donald advanced to second and third base on defensive indifference during Trevor Crowe's at-bat, and Crowe grounded out to Brandon Inge, ending the game in a 3–0 victory for the Tigers.

== Statistics ==
=== Linescore ===
Team	1	2	3	4	5	6	7	8	9	R	H	E
Cleveland	0	0	0	0	0	0	0	0	0	0	1	1
Detroit	0	1	0	0	0	0	0	2	X	3	9	0
WP: Armando Galarraga (2–1) LP: Roberto Hernández (4–4); Home runs: CLE: None; DET: Miguel Cabrera (15)

=== Boxscore ===
Cleveland	AB	R	H	RBI	BB	SO	LOB	AVG
Crowe, CF	4	0	0	0	0	0	1	.240
Choo, RF	3	0	0	0	0	0	0	.275
Kearns, LF	3	0	0	0	0	1	0	.282
Hafner, DH	3	0	0	0	0	0	0	.258
Peralta, J, 3B	3	0	0	0	0	1	0	.243
Branyan, 1B	3	0	0	0	0	0	0	.235
Grudzielanek, 2B	3	0	0	0	0	1	0	.283
Redmond, M, C	3	0	0	0	0	0	0	.220
Donald, SS	3	0	1	0	0	0	0	.280
Totals	28	0	1	0	0	3	1	.243

Cleveland	IP	H	R	ER	BB	SO	HR	ERA
Hernández	8	9	3	2	0	3	1	3.53

Detroit	AB	R	H	RBI	BB	SO	LOB	AVG
Jackson, A, CF	4	1	3	0	0	0	0	.332
Damon, LF	4	1	1	0	0	0	2	.277
Kelly, LF	0	0	0	0	0	0	0	.277
Ordóñez, RF	4	0	1	1	0	0	0	.307
Cabrera, M, 1B	4	1	2	1	0	1	1	.351
Boesch, DH	3	0	1	0	0	1	0	.319
Guillén, C, 2B	3	0	0	0	0	0	2	.265
Inge, 3B	3	0	0	0	0	1	2	.232
Avila, C	3	0	1	0	0	0	0	.192
Santiago, SS	3	0	0	0	0	0	1	.239
Totals	31	3	9	2	0	3	8	.267

Detroit	IP	H	R	ER	BB	SO	HR	ERA
Galarraga	9	1	0	0	0	3	0	2.57

Source: MLB.com

== Historical context ==
Only four days before Galarraga's near-perfect outing, Roy Halladay pitched a perfect game for the Philadelphia Phillies, and just 20 days prior to that, Dallas Braden threw a perfect game for the Oakland Athletics. Halladay's and Braden's perfect games had been the first pair of such games to occur in the same season during the modern era, let alone the same month. Joyce served as the second-base umpire for Braden's perfect game.

The 20 days between Braden's perfect game and Halladay's was the shortest span between two perfect games since 1880 and there was a chance that for the first time in MLB history there would be three perfect games in such short succession. Had Galarraga's game been correctly called, the four-day span since Halladay's perfect game would have broken that 130-year-old record and marked the only time that three consecutive no-hitters had been perfect games, the only time that three perfect games had occurred in one season (later done in 2012 by Philip Humber, Matt Cain and Félix Hernández), the only time that three perfect games had occurred in a span shorter than a month, the only time four perfect games had occurred in a span shorter than a year (as Mark Buehrle of the Chicago White Sox threw a perfect game in July 2009) and the only time that four perfect games had occurred within a stretch of five no-hitters.

This would have also marked the first perfect game in the Tigers' 110-year history. The 83 pitches thrown before the blown call would have been the fewest pitches in a perfect game since 1908. Galarraga's near-perfect game was the first such game since Mike Mussina's bid for a perfect game on September 2, 2001, which was broken up by 27th batter Carl Everett. It was also the third time for a Tigers pitcher to come so close to a perfect game, as Tommy Bridges missed retiring the 27th batter on August 5, 1932 and Milt Wilcox also could not retire the 27th batter on April 15, 1983.

Galarraga's near-perfect game was the tenth time in major league history that the 27th batter in a game broke up a potential perfect game. One other occurrence also involved a missed call by an umpire, who later admitted to his mistake. On July 4, 1908, Hooks Wiltse of the New York Giants, perfect through 26 batters, hit Philadelphia Phillies pitcher George McQuillan on a 2–2 count in a scoreless game. Umpire Cy Rigler later admitted that he should have called the previous pitch strike three, which would have ended the inning. Wiltse pitched on, winning 1–0 in 10 innings, with the hit batsman the only lapse separating him from a perfect game.

== Reactions ==
=== Armando Galarraga and Jim Joyce ===
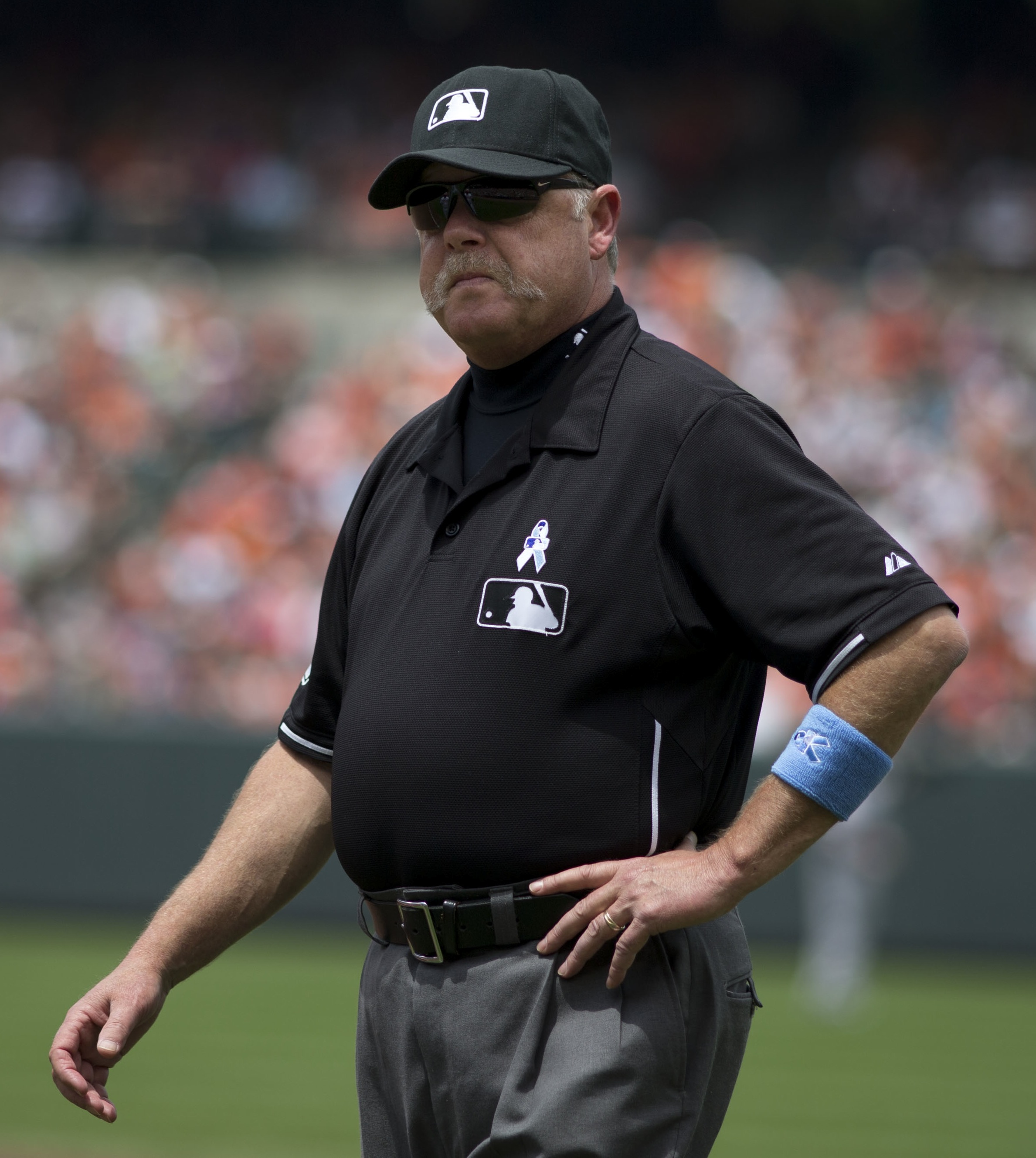
Umpire Jim Joyce

On tagging first base after Cabrera's relay, Galarraga began celebrating his accomplishment. His immediate reaction to Joyce's on-field ruling was a momentary pause followed by a wry smile at the umpire before returning to the mound. Galarraga told reporters after the game that the outing "was my best game, so far" and said that Joyce "probably feels more bad than me. Nobody's perfect. Everybody's human. I understand. I give the guy a lot of credit for saying, 'I need to talk to you.' You don't see an umpire tell you that after a game. I gave him a hug." He also told reporters, "I know that I pitched a perfect game, I believe I got it. I said before, I got a perfect game. I'm going to show my son. Maybe it's not in the book, but I'm going to tell my son, 'One time I got a perfect game.' I'll show him the CD," further calling his effort "the first 28-out perfect game."

Joyce, a 22-year veteran, who later received death threats from Detroit fans, tearfully admitted after reviewing video of the play after the game that "I did not get the call correct," insisting that he "took a perfect game away from that kid over there that worked his ass off all night." Joyce called the Donald ruling "the biggest call of my career," claiming that "I thought [Donald] beat the throw. I was convinced he beat the throw, until I saw the replay."

Tigers' manager Jim Leyland said "It's a crying shame. Jim [Joyce] is a class guy. This sounds crazy, but after looking at the play, nobody is going to feel worse than he does. I yelled a bit after the game because emotions are high. You just want it so bad for the kid. I don't think you're as mad at the umpire as mad the kid didn't get it—and he did deserve it." Leyland also said that Joyce's call was part of the "human element of the game." The umpire later said, "I didn't want this to be my 15 minutes of fame. I would have liked my 15 minutes to be a great call in the World Series. Hopefully, my 15 minutes are over now."

Just prior to the next day's game, Leyland sent Galarraga to take the Tigers' lineup to Joyce, who was serving as the home plate umpire that day. The two shook hands and a tearful Joyce gave the pitcher a pat on the shoulder, with a warm reception from the audience. Joyce's accountability and regret, and Galarraga's sportsmanship, were widely praised for turning the unfortunate situation into a positive.

=== The broadcasters ===
Ground ball, right side, Cabrera, will cut it off, Galarraga covers, HE'S OUT- NO, he's safe! He is safe! He is safe at first base!

— Mario Impemba reacts to the blown call on Fox Sports Detroit

1-1 pitch, swing and a ground ball right side, backhanded by Cabrera, he's going to turn, throw to first and.. THEY DIDN'T GET IT! OH MAN!

— Dan Dickerson calls the game on WXYT.

Slowly hit. Cabrera. Throws. And he's safe! Jim Joyce calls him safe!

— Matt Underwood calls the infamous play on Sportstime Ohio.

Galarraga pumps and fires. A swing and a ground ball to the right side, Cabrera backhands it, sets, throws to Galarraga, NOT IN TIME!

— Tom Hamilton's reaction on WTAM.

=== The rest of MLB ===
Many people within Major League Baseball spoke out in support of Joyce, offering their sympathies and noting his exceptional reputation. New York Yankees pitcher Mariano Rivera said, "It happened to the best umpire we have in our game. The best. And a perfect gentleman. ... It's a shame for both of them, for the pitcher and for the umpire. But I'm telling you he is the best baseball has, and a great guy. It's just a shame." Former Chicago Cubs pitcher Milt Pappas said, "I would tell [Galarraga], 'I feel for you. There have been only 20 perfect games in the history of baseball. The umpire situation was the same one I had—they blew it. At least I had the satisfaction of getting the no-hitter. You don't. I feel for you. You pitched a tremendous game. At least you have the satisfaction of the umpire saying he was sorry. But that doesn't help your situation as far as a perfect game." Pappas' own bid for a perfect game on September 2, 1972, was spoiled when umpire Bruce Froemming called a borderline 3-and-2 pitch to 27th batter Larry Stahl a ball, issuing a walk to the pinch-hitter. Former Yankees pitcher Don Larsen—who threw the fourth perfect game of the modern era and the only one in World Series history on October 8, 1956—said, "I feel sorry for the umpire, and I just feel real badly for the kid. He's probably wondering right now whose side God is on."

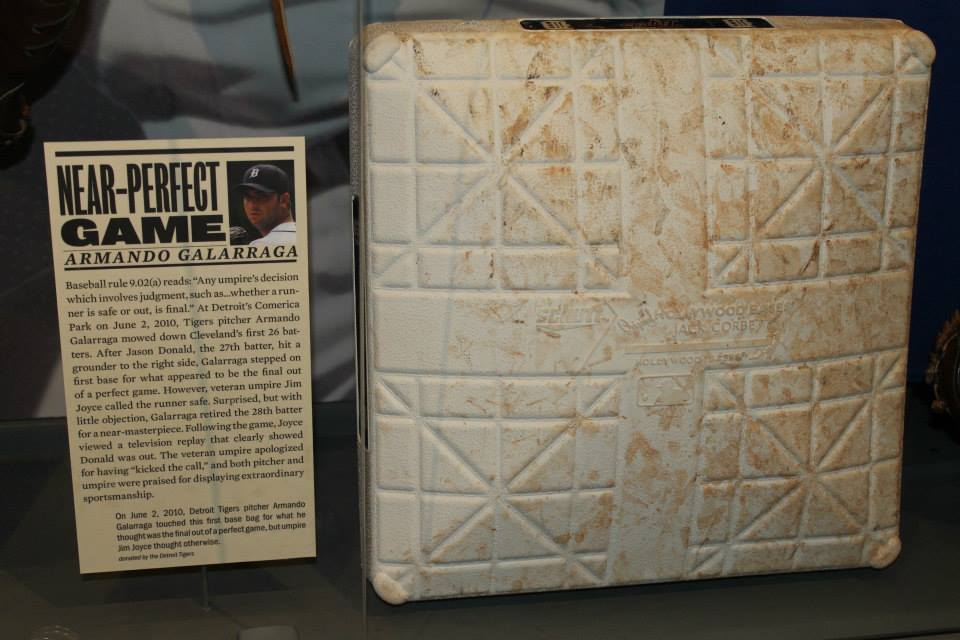
First base used at Comerica Park in Detroit on the occasion of Armando Galarraga's near-perfect game. Baseball Hall of Fame, Cooperstown, New York

The incorrect call led many baseball writers to call for the increased use of instant replay in baseball, which was used only to review disputed home runs during the 2010 season. Many journalists also advocated for MLB commissioner Bud Selig to overturn Joyce's call and award a perfect game to Galarraga. On June 3, Selig announced that Major League Baseball would look at expanded replay and umpiring, but he did not specifically address Joyce's call. A baseball official familiar with the decision confirmed to the Associated Press that the call would not be reversed. For his efforts in the game, Galarraga was named the American League Player of the Week on June 7. The base, a ball used in the game and Galarraga's spikes were sent to the Baseball Hall of Fame.

Less than two weeks after the controversial game, ESPN The Magazine released an anonymous poll of 100 current MLB players that named Joyce as the best umpire in Major League Baseball. Joyce was named on 53% of ballots, 19 ballots ahead of second-place Tim McClelland. One player was quoted as saying, "The sad thing about the Galarraga game is, Jim Joyce is seriously one of the best umpires around... He always calls it fair, so players love him. Everyone makes mistakes, and it's terrible that this happened to him." The players in the poll overwhelmingly endorsed (86%) Selig's decision to not overturn the call, and were strongly against (77%) instituting replay for calls on the bases.

=== Outside baseball ===
On June 3, White House Press Secretary Robert Gibbs said during his morning press briefing: "I hope that baseball awards a perfect game to that pitcher," joking that the White House was "going to work on an executive order" to that effect. He elaborated, "To watch an umpire take responsibility and to watch a pitcher do what he did, the type of sportsmanship that was exhibited there—I think that gives a lot of heart (...) I think it's tremendously heartening to see somebody understand that they made a mistake and somebody accept the apology from somebody who made that mistake. I think that's a good lesson in baseball." Michigan governor Jennifer Granholm also issued a gubernatorial proclamation stating, in part, "I, Jennifer M. Granholm, governor of the state of Michigan, do hereby declare Armando Galarraga to have pitched a perfect game." Her proclamation means that Galarraga is indeed credited with a perfect game, if only in the state of Michigan.

Former SportsCenter co-host Keith Olbermann dedicated a special edition of the "Worst Person in the World" segment of his political commentary show Countdown to lambasting Bud Selig's refusal to reverse Joyce's call. While Olbermann ordinarily lists three "Worsts," Selig alone was awarded the title because "there can only be one Worst Person tonight." Olbermann went on to cite Lee MacPhail's handling of George Brett's 1983 Pine Tar Incident as an example of a commissioner overruling an umpire's call, and discussed the matter with both Governor Granholm and documentarian Ken Burns.

The day after the botched call, in a ceremony before the Tigers' game, General Motors presented Galarraga with a red 2010 Chevrolet Corvette Grand Sport convertible, recognizing his outstanding performance on and off the field. GM North American president Mark Reuss said that the way in which Galarraga had handled the situation deserved recognition. Galarraga was presented with a "Medal of Reasonableness" by Jon Stewart at the Rally to Restore Sanity and/or Fear for his measured response. On July 14, 2010, Joyce and Galarraga together presented the ESPY Award for Best Moment at the Nokia Theatre in Los Angeles. The winner was the stoppage-time goal scored by Landon Donovan for the United States against Algeria at the 2010 FIFA World Cup.

In April 2022, a law class at Monmouth University collaborated to create an 82-page document addressed to Commissioner of Baseball Rob Manfred, arguing that Galarraga should be retroactively awarded the perfect game distinction. The document cited the Pine Tar Incident and Harvey Haddix's former no-hitter as precedent for the league retroactively changing the statistics and outcomes of official games. In appreciation of the class's efforts, Galarraga conducted a Zoom video meeting with the students to express his gratitude. Manfred would not overturn the call, claiming that doing so “would open a Pandora's box of issues from the history of the game where past and future errors would constantly be vulnerable to scrutiny and disputes." but would also meet with them over a one hour Zoom call due to how he was impressed by their effort.

=== Book release and resulting MLB rule ===
Galarraga and Joyce, along with Daniel Paisner, released a book titled Nobody's Perfect, chronicling their experiences during and after the game. In June 2011, one year after the near-perfect game, Major League Baseball barred Joyce from acting as umpire in any games in which Galarraga's team played because the book release made the two business partners. This was similar to the policy that prevented umpire Jim Wolf (who coincidentally was the second-base umpire during the near-perfect game) from being the plate umpire in games in which his younger brother Randy pitched.

=== The Athletic interview ===
In a 2020 interview with The Athletic, almost 10 years after the game and eight years after his retirement, Galarraga renewed the call for Major League Baseball to award him a perfect game. Joyce also voiced support for the change in the interview, agreeing with Galarraga "because he did it." This reignited the debate surrounding the game, with Galarraga claiming that he did not "want to die, and then they'll be like, 'You know what, he threw a perfect game'." Those in favor of the change voiced their support, as the outcome of the game was not in any doubt if the call were to be changed. Opponents stress that the notoriety of the near-perfect game is itself a different kind of reward, and believe overturning the decision would cause the game to be forgotten.

== In popular culture ==
Singer-songwriter Dan Bern composed and recorded a song, "Joyce and Galarraga," about the game. It appears on his 2012 album of baseball-themed songs, Doubleheader.
