= Armando Galarraga =

Venezuelan baseball player (born 1982)

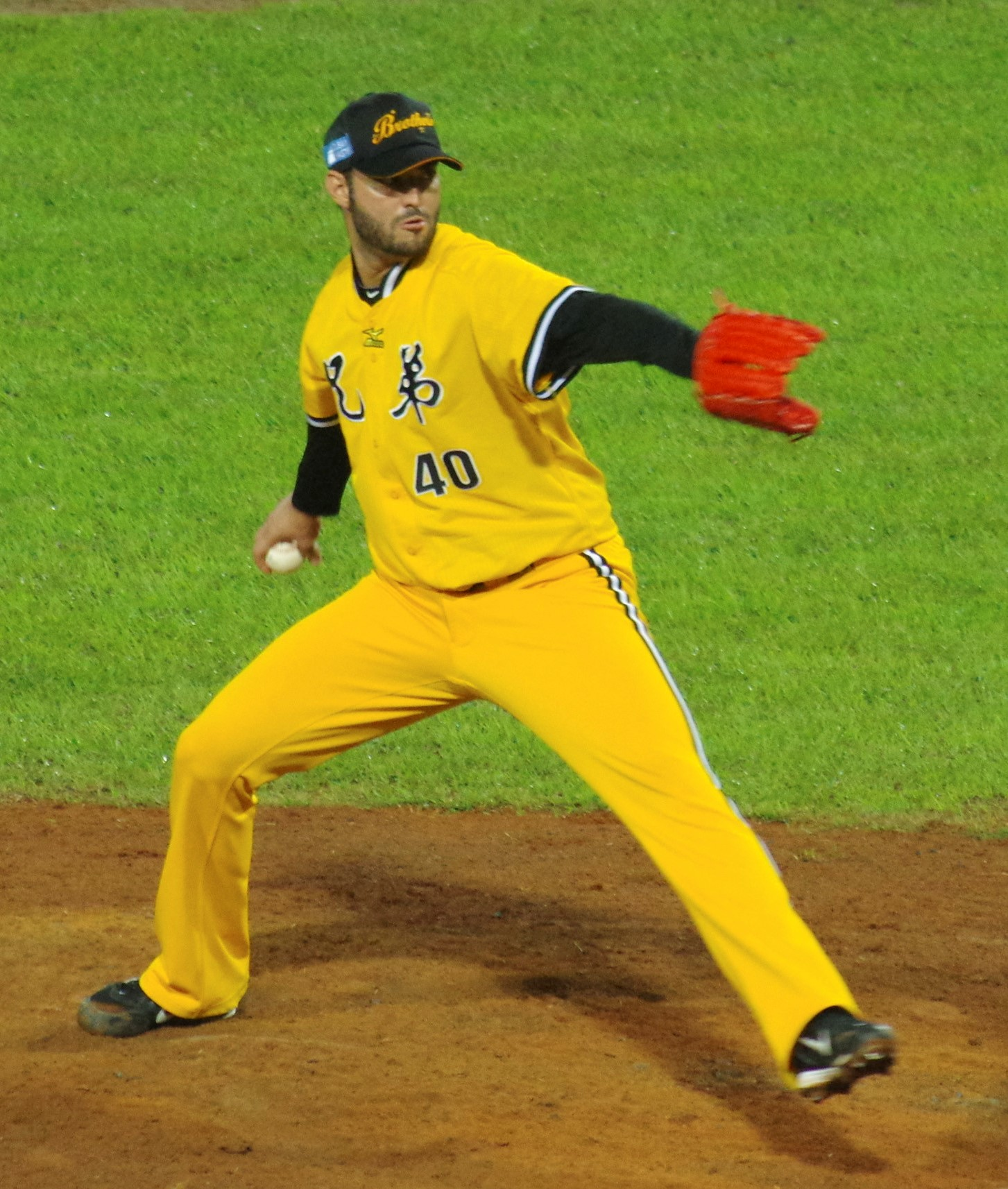
- Galarraga pitching for the Chinatrust Brothers in 2014
- Pitcher
- Born: January 15, 1982 (age 44); Cumaná, Venezuela
- Batted: Right Threw: Right

Professional debut
- MLB: September 15, 2007, for the Texas Rangers
- CPBL: April 26, 2014, for the Chinatrust Brothers

Last appearance
- MLB: August 19, 2012, for the Houston Astros
- CPBL: June 29, 2014, for the Chinatrust Brothers

MLB statistics
- Win–loss record: 26–34
- Earned run average: 4.78
- Strikeouts: 346

CPBL statistics
- Win–loss record: 1–5
- Earned run average: 4.47
- Strikeouts: 12
- Stats at Baseball Reference

Teams
- Texas Rangers (2007); Detroit Tigers (2008–2010); Arizona Diamondbacks (2011); Houston Astros (2012); Chinatrust Brothers (2014)

Armando Antonio Galarraga Barreto (born January 15, 1982) is a Venezuelan former professional baseball pitcher. Galarraga made his Major League Baseball (MLB) debut with the Texas Rangers on September 15, 2007. He was traded to the Detroit Tigers at the end of the 2007 season where he spent three seasons. He then played in MLB for the Arizona Diamondbacks and Houston Astros. In 2010, Galarraga was one out away from a perfect game when first base umpire Jim Joyce incorrectly called the runner safe.

== Playing career ==
=== Texas Rangers ===
He originally signed as a free agent with the Montreal Expos on October 31, 1998. He was acquired by the Texas Rangers from the Washington Nationals as part of the deal that sent Alfonso Soriano to the Nationals in 2005.

Galarraga made his Major League debut on September 15, 2007, against the Oakland Athletics. He entered the game in the eighth inning, and pitched a scoreless inning. He allowed no hits and one base on balls.

=== Detroit Tigers ===
==== 2008 ====
On February 5, 2008, Galarraga was traded to the Detroit Tigers for Michael Hernandez, an outfielder that had spent the last season playing for the AA Erie SeaWolves. As a minor league call up for the injured Dontrelle Willis, Galarraga earned his first career win April 16, 2008, in a 13–2 victory over the Cleveland Indians.

On June 13, 2008, Galarraga pitched seven shutout innings in a 5–0 victory over the Los Angeles Dodgers. He finished the 2008 campaign with a 13–7 record, a 3.73 earned run average (ERA), and 126 strikeouts in 178 2/3 innings. When batters did hit the ball against him, they only managed a .237 batting average on balls in play, the lowest in the Major Leagues. Galarraga threw sliders 38.9% of the time in 2008, more than any other starting pitcher in the majors.

After a superb rookie season, Galarraga finished fourth in the balloting for the 2008 American League Rookie of the Year Award.

==== 2009 ====
On April 10, 2009, Galarraga pitched the home opener at Comerica Park. Tigers manager Jim Leyland said Galarraga deserved to pitch Opening Day after having an impressive 2008 season. The Tigers won the game 15–2, which included a grand slam by Miguel Cabrera. On April 29, prior to a game against the New York Yankees, Galarraga received his 2008 Tigers Rookie of the Year award from the Detroit Sports Broadcasters Association.

Statistically, Galarraga did not approach the success he achieved in the 2008 season. His 2009 ERA was a below average 5.64, and opposing batters hit a high .284 against him.

==== 2010 ====
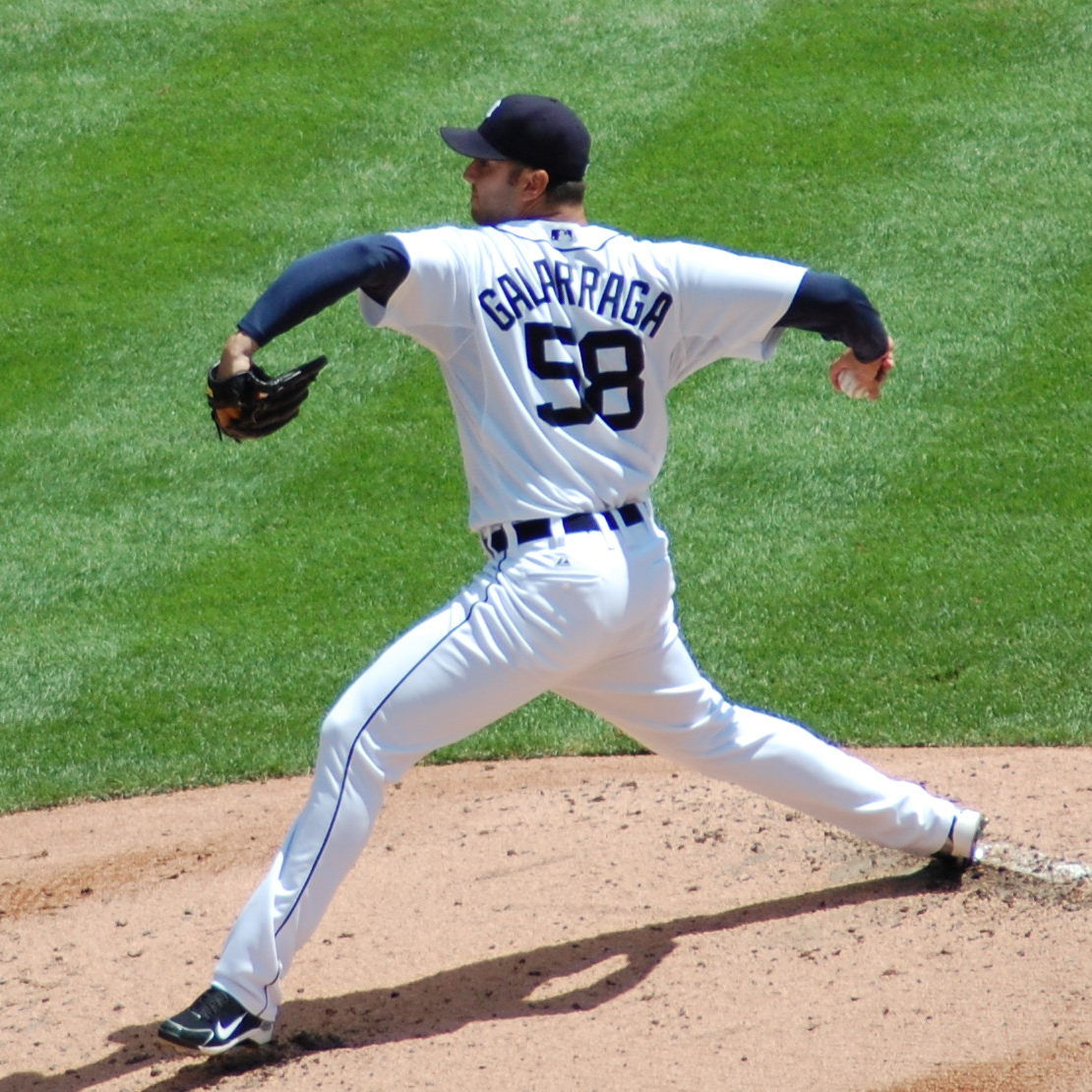
Galarraga pitching in July 2010

In seven innings of work in spring training of 2010, Galarraga allowed nine runs, 14 hits and seven walks. That, coupled with his attitude ("They've seen my stuff; they know what I can do", Galarraga said during his ineffective spring training stint), prompted the Tigers to option him to the Tigers Triple-A affiliate Toledo on March 18, 2010. Galarraga was called up to the Tigers in May 2010 and was put into the starting rotation. He had an ERA of 4.50 as of June 1. Galarraga was optioned to Toledo on July 6, 2010, but Tigers GM Dave Dombrowski has said he would return on July 20 and start against Texas. On July 19, the Tigers recalled Galarraga. On January 18, 2011, Galarraga was designated for assignment by the Tigers.

==== "The 28-out perfect game" ====
Galarraga clearly makes the final out for his perfect game, but umpire Jim Joyce incorrectly called Jason Donald safe. Derived from Fox Sports Detroit.

On June 2, 2010, Galarraga pitched 8 2/3 perfect innings, but the perfect game disappeared on the 27th batter after what was ruled an infield hit. Rookie Jason Donald hit a ground ball to first baseman Miguel Cabrera, who tossed to Galarraga—who was covering first base—but first base umpire Jim Joyce incorrectly called Donald safe, ending the perfect game and no-hitter bids. Galarraga retired the next batter, completing the one-hitter, though many in the Tiger press preferred to call it "the 28-out perfect game." Galarraga threw 88 pitches, 67 of them for strikes. If he had completed the perfect game (83 pitches), it would have been the lowest number of pitches thrown since Addie Joss's 74 in 1908, and the shortest game since Sandy Koufax's perfect game in 1965. It would have been the second perfect game in the Major Leagues in just four days, Philadelphia's Roy Halladay having thrown his on May 29, and the third in 24 days (Dallas Braden of Oakland on May 9).

Joyce, who later received death threats from Tigers fans, issued a direct apology to Galarraga, saying that the call was incorrect. Galarraga accepted the mistake gracefully, saying later, "Nobody's perfect." Observers pointed to the handling of the situation as an example of good sportsmanship on both sides. Galarraga was presented with a "Medal of Reasonableness" for his reasoned response to Joyce's call at the Rally to Restore Sanity and/or Fear. The Baseball Hall of Fame has the cleats Galaragga wore along with the first base from the 28-out perfect game on display.

=== Arizona Diamondbacks ===
On January 24, 2011, he was traded to the Arizona Diamondbacks in exchange for pitchers Kevin Eichhorn and Ryan Robowski.

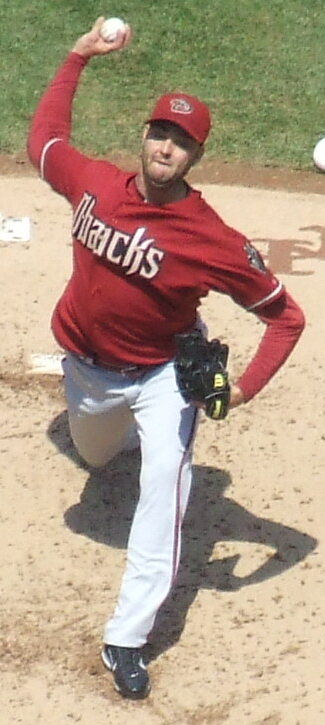
Galarraga pitching in April 2011

On May 18, 2011, Galarraga was designated for assignment, he cleared waivers and was sent outright to Triple-A Reno Aces on May 20. He elected free agency following the season on September 30.

=== Baltimore Orioles ===
On January 30, 2012, Galarraga signed a minor league contract with the Baltimore Orioles. He was released on April 5.

=== Houston Astros ===
On May 21, 2012, Galarraga signed a minor league contract with the Houston Astros. He had his contract selected to the major league roster on July 28. He pitched in five games for the Astros between July 28 and August 19, losing four of them. Galarraga was designated for assignment on August 22, he cleared waivers and was released on August 25.

=== Cincinnati Reds ===
On January 17, 2013, Galarraga signed a minor league contract with the Cincinnati Reds.

=== Colorado Rockies ===
On July 15, 2013, Galarraga was traded to the Colorado Rockies in exchange for Parker Frazier. He was assigned to the Triple–A Colorado Springs Sky Sox. He elected free agency following the season on November 4.

=== Texas Rangers ===
On February 3, 2014, Galarraga signed a minor league contract with the Texas Rangers. He was released on March 23.

=== Chinatrust Brothers ===
On April 17, 2014, Galarraga signed with the Chinatrust Brothers of the Chinese Professional Baseball League. He pitched 10 games and posted an ERA of 4.47. He was released by the club on July 5, 2014.

=== Pericos de Puebla ===
On February 6, 2015, Galarraga signed with the Pericos de Puebla of the Mexican League. In 10 starts for Puebla, Galarraga logged a 3–3 record and 3.75 ERA with 26 strikeouts across 50 1/3 innings pitched. He was released by the Pericos on June 21.

In between, Galarraga played winter ball with the Leones del Caracas club of the Venezuelan League in parts of seven seasons spanning 2009–2014.

Galarraga retired from professional baseball in December 2015.

== Personal life ==
Armando and his first wife Christin met when he was a minor league player for the Montreal Expos and she was a strength and conditioning coach for the team. The couple had two wedding ceremonies: one in Chicago, Illinois on January 19, 2008, and the other in Venezuela on January 28. He has a daughter, Savannah, born in 2013 from his first marriage which ended in divorce. As of 2020, he is married to Ana, his second wife.

As of 2025, Galarraga runs a baseball academy in Austin, Texas.

== See also ==
- List of Major League Baseball players from Venezuela
