= Landon Powell =

American baseball player and coach (born 1982)

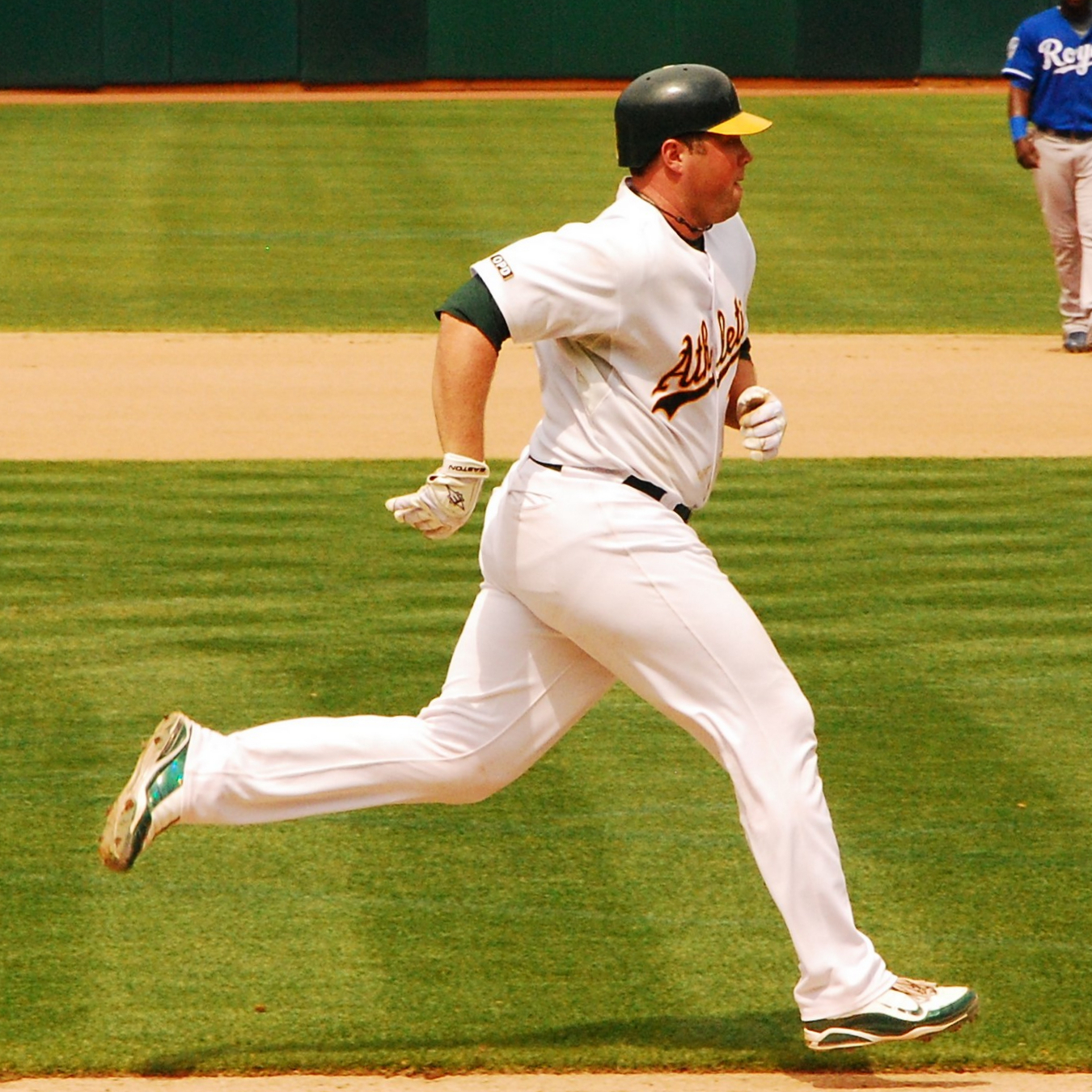
- Powell with the Oakland Athletics in 2009
- Catcher
- Born: March 19, 1982 (age 43); Raleigh, North Carolina, U.S.
- Batted: Switch Threw: Right

MLB debut
- April 11, 2009, for the Oakland Athletics

Last MLB appearance
- September 28, 2011, for the Oakland Athletics

MLB statistics
- Batting average: .207
- Home runs: 10
- Runs batted in: 45
- Stats at Baseball Reference

Teams
- Oakland Athletics (2009–2011)
Medals
Men's baseball
Representing United States
World Youth Baseball Championship
Gold medal – first place	1998 Fairview Heights	Team

Landon Reed Powell (born March 19, 1982) is an American former professional baseball player and current coach. He played in Major League Baseball as a catcher from 2009 to 2011 for the Oakland Athletics. Powell is the current head baseball coach of the North Greenville Trailblazers. He played college baseball at South Carolina from 2001 to 2004. He was the Athletics' catcher on May 9, 2010, when pitcher Dallas Braden threw a perfect game.

== High school ==
Powell attended Apex High School in Apex, North Carolina. He helped lead the Apex baseball team to the 2000 North Carolina 4A state title as a junior.

While he was a junior in high school, because he was already 18 years old, Powell was eligible to enter the 2000 Major League Baseball draft, and did so. However, he went undrafted because his agent, Scott Boras, did not inform teams he was available. This made Powell a free agent, but he chose to attend college after not receiving an acceptable offer from an MLB club. This loophole in the drafting system was later closed due to this incident and would happen again one year later involving pitcher Jeremy Bonderman.

== College ==
Powell attended the University of South Carolina. In 2002, as a sophomore, he had a .292 batting average with 12 home runs and started at catcher as the team went to the 2002 College World Series. The Gamecocks made a run to the finals, but eventually lost to the Texas Longhorns in the last College World Series to have a single game final series. In 2003 the tournament would expand the finals to a best of 3. In 2003 and 2004, Powell once again helped lead the University of South Carolina to the CWS and ranked third on the team in batting average in 2003 (.339) and 2004 (.328). Powell received College World Series all-tournament honors as a catcher in both 2002 and 2003. In his four seasons with the Gamecocks, Powell was a leading offensive threat. He finished with a career batting average of .306 as a switch-hitting catcher, with 44 home runs, 61 doubles, and 193 RBI. The two-time team captain was named as an All-American in 2002 and 2004 as well as all-SEC in his senior season.

In 2010, Powell was named to the NCAA World Series Legends Team. He and Ryan Garko were named as catchers.

== Professional career ==
=== Draft ===
After three seasons with the Gamecocks, Powell was drafted by the Chicago Cubs in the 2003 Major League Baseball draft as the 733rd overall pick in the 25th round. He did not sign with the Cubs and opted instead to play another season with the University of South Carolina. After his final season there, he entered the draft again in 2004 and the switch hitting catcher was taken in the 1st round by the Oakland Athletics as the 24th overall pick and was the Athletics' first overall pick. Major League scouts reported Powell had a great baseball IQ, and soft hands which made him a top prospect.

=== Oakland Athletics ===
Upon signing with the Athletics on July 22, 2004, he was assigned to play for the Single-A Vancouver Canadians. He played in 38 games and hit just .237. Teammate Kurt Suzuki, also taken in the 2004 draft, got more playing time as he played in 46 games and hit .297. Both were the organizations catchers of the future and only time would tell who would reach the majors first. Powell's chances were ruined when in 2005, he was out for the entire season when he underwent surgery to repair a left torn ACL. After a lost year, he played again in 2006, playing for the Single-A Stockton Ports and the Double-A Midland RockHounds.

Powell began the 2007 season playing for the Rockhounds. In 60 games with them, he hit .292 with 11 home runs. He was promoted to play with the Triple-A Sacramento River Cats on June 28. He played just 4 games for the River Cats before reaggravating the same knee that forced him to sit the 2005 season. Powell missed the rest of the 2007 season. He was considered as a possibility to split the catching duties for the major league club in 2008 but with his injury, it wasn't possible.

On November 20, 2007, the Athletics purchased his contract, protecting him from the Rule 5 draft.

Powell made his major league debut for the Athletics on April 11, 2009. In his first major league at-bat, Powell doubled in the second inning off the Seattle Mariners' Félix Hernández, driving in two runs. He spent the entire season in the big leagues, yet only appeared in 46 games (36 at catcher, 6 at first base and 3 at DH), as Kurt Suzuki for the second straight year led the majors in games caught. He finished the season with .229 batting average with 7 home runs and 30 RBIs.

On May 9, 2010, Powell caught Dallas Braden's perfect game.

Powell was designated for assignment on December 23, 2011, and outrighted to the Sacramento River Cats on January 5, 2012. On March 9, 2012, Powell was released by the Athletics.

=== Houston Astros ===
On March 14, 2012, Powell signed a minor league deal with the Houston Astros with an invite to spring training. On April 3, 2012, Houston assigned him to the Oklahoma City RedHawks. He became a free agent following the season.

=== New York Mets ===
On January 18, 2013, Powell signed a minor league contract with the New York Mets with an invite to spring training.

Reassigned to AAA Las Vegas 51s on March 30, 2013. On June 8, 2013, the Las Vegas 51s released Powell from his contract.

== Coaching ==
On May 9, 2014, Powell was hired by North Greenville University, a Division II school located in Tigerville, South Carolina, to be the head coach of the baseball team. On June 10, 2022, Powell managed the North Greenville Crusaders to their first ever Baseball NCAA DII National Championship winning over Point Loma University with a final score of 5–3.

== Personal life ==
On January 25, 2013, Powell and his wife Allyson lost their infant daughter Izzy, who died from Hemophagocytic lymphohistiocytosis. Powell continues to raise awareness for the need for organ donation, due to his own struggles with autoimmune hepatitis. The Powells have two other children, a son and another daughter.
