= Dallas Braden's perfect game =

2010 baseball game in California, U.S.

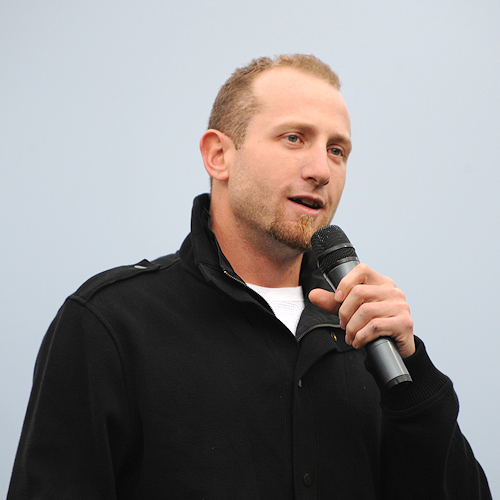
- Dallas Braden in 2010
Tampa Bay Rays	Oakland Athletics
0	4
	1	2	3	4	5	6	7	8	9	R	H	E
Tampa Bay Rays	0	0	0	0	0	0	0	0	0	0	0	1
Oakland Athletics	0	1	1	2	0	0	0	0	x	4	12	0
- Date: May 9, 2010
- Venue: Oakland–Alameda County Coliseum
- City: Oakland, California
- Managers: Joe Maddon (Tampa Bay Rays); Bob Geren (Oakland Athletics)
- Umpires: HP: Jim Wolf; 1B: Derryl Cousins; 2B: Jim Joyce; 3B: Todd Tichenor
- Television: Comcast SportsNet California
- TV announcers: Glen Kuiper (play-by-play); Ray Fosse (color commentary)

On May 9, 2010, Dallas Braden of the Oakland Athletics threw a perfect game against the Tampa Bay Rays at Oakland–Alameda County Coliseum. It was the 19th perfect game in Major League Baseball history. Braden threw 109 pitches, struck out 6 of the 27 batters he faced, and had a game score of 93.

Braden's perfect game occurred on Mother's Day, a holiday he resented due to the death of his mother from melanoma. He got drunk the night before and was still suffering from the effects of a hangover when he got to the stadium. Of the 27 batters Braden faced, the at bats that posed the greatest threat were Jason Bartlett's at bat in the first inning and Gabe Kapler's at bat in the ninth inning. Bartlett hit a line drive that forced third baseman Kevin Kouzmanoff to make a jumping catch. In Kapler's at bat, Braden incorrectly believed the count was two balls and two strikes when it was actually three balls and one strike. Braden threw a pitch outside of the strike zone, and had Kapler not swung at it, he would have drawn a walk and ended the perfect game.

Braden's grandmother, Peggy Lindsey—who raised him after his mother died—was in attendance. After the final out was recorded, the two hugged on the field and kissed the Saint Christopher medallion Braden was wearing. Braden would suffer from injuries throughout the remainder of his career and retired from baseball in 2014. He then became a sports commentator for ESPN and NBC Sports California. In 2023, he provided commentary for Domingo Germán's perfect game against the Athletics, making him the only person to have both thrown a perfect game and called a perfect game as a commentator.

== Background ==
=== Perfect game ===
In baseball, a perfect game occurs when a pitcher (or pitchers) complete a full game with no batter from the opposing team reaching base. In baseball leagues that feature nine-inning games like Major League Baseball (MLB), this means the pitchers involved must record an out against 27 consecutive batters, without allowing any hits, walks, hit batsmen, uncaught third strikes, catcher's or fielder's interference, or fielding errors. It is widely considered by sportswriters to be the hardest single-game accomplishment in the sport, as it requires an incredible pitching performance, defensive support, and immense luck to pull off. Since 1876, there have been over 237,000 games officially recognized by MLB; only 24 have been perfect games. Prior to Braden's perfect game, the most recent occurrence was in 2009, when Mark Buehrle of the Chicago White Sox threw one against the Tampa Bay Rays.

=== Dallas Braden ===
Dallas Braden made his debut for the Oakland Athletics in 2007 and, by 2009, had cemented his role as a starting pitcher for the team. Shortly before his perfect game, Braden made national headlines when he got into an argument with New York Yankees player Alex Rodriguez. During an April 22 game, Rodriguez walked across the pitcher's mound, to which Braden took exception. Braden said: "I don't care if I'm Cy Young or the 25th man on a roster, if I've got the ball in my hand and I'm out there on that mound, that's not your mound." Rodriguez dismissed the pitcher after the game and stated, "I really don't want to extend his extra 15 minutes of fame." The argument became a notable story in New York–based tabloids, and many outlets like Pardon the Interruption echoed Rodriguez's remarks of Braden's supposed irrelevance.

Braden's perfect game took place on Mother's Day, a holiday he resented due to the death of his mother, Jodie Atwood, from melanoma. After Atwood's death, Braden was raised by his grandmother Peggy Lindsey, who attended every game he started. The night before, Braden wanted to numb the pain of Mother's Day and decided to get drunk with some of his friends.

== The game ==
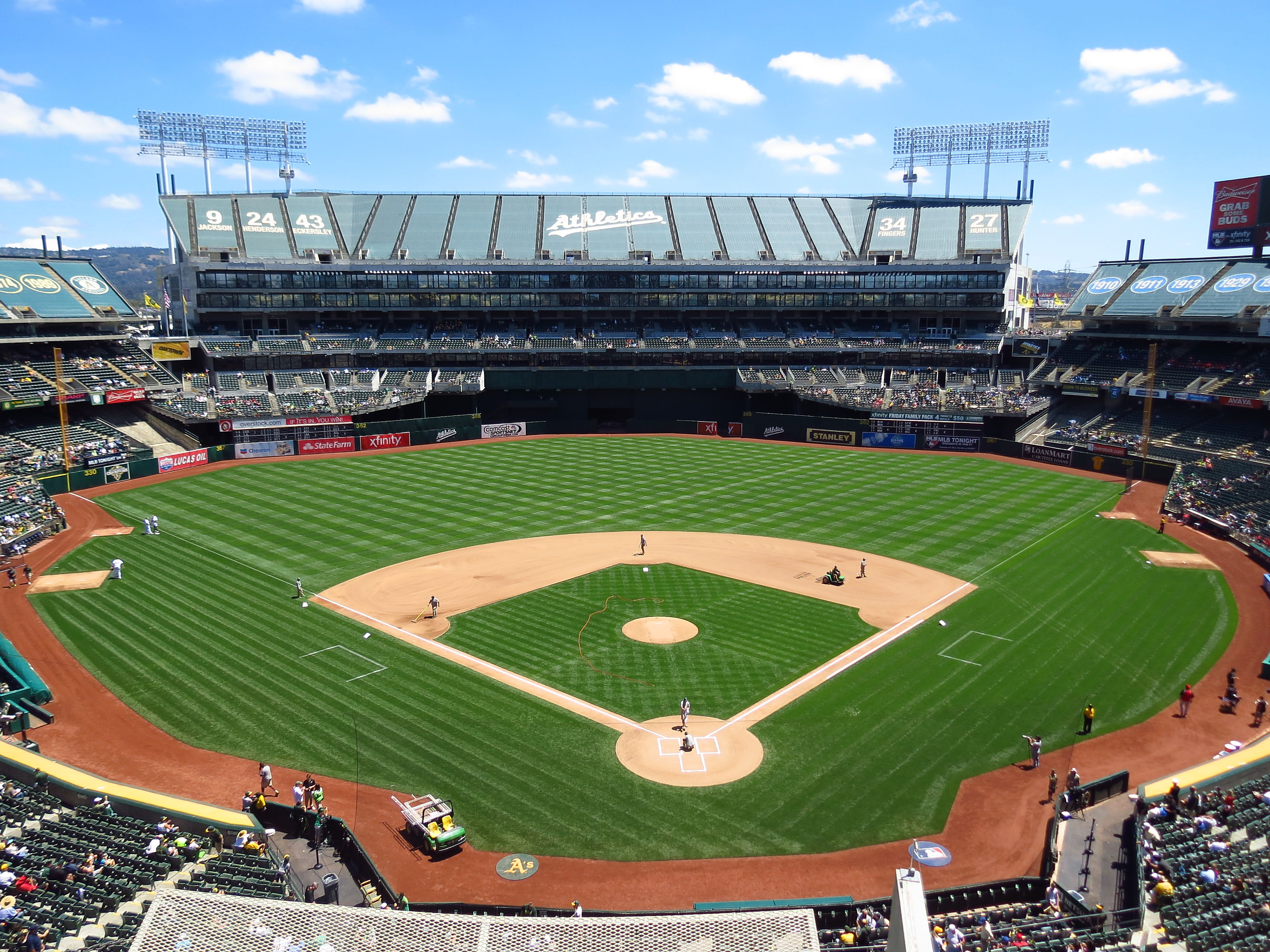
Oakland–Alameda County Coliseum, the site of Braden's perfect game

Braden's perfect game occurred on May 9, 2010. The Athletics were playing the Rays at Oakland–Alameda County Coliseum in Oakland, California. The attendance was 12,228. Braden woke up hungover and arrived at the stadium much later than normal. Athletics video coordinator Adam Rhoden noted that Braden usually would spend two hours before every game reading scouting reports of opposing batters, but for that game, he only had enough time to warm up and play catch with his catcher, Landon Powell. Braden confided his emotions with Powell, who noticed how the lack of preparation was affecting the pitcher. According to Powell, "He did panic that day a little more than he normally did."

The first batter of the game for the Rays was Jason Bartlett, who hit a line drive that forced third baseman Kevin Kouzmanoff to make a jumping catch. The Associated Press later described it as "the closest the Rays got to a hit". After Bartlett's at bat, Braden induced outs from the next 8 batters, including strikeouts to B.J. Upton and Willy Aybar. In the second inning, the Athletics took the lead when Powell hit a single that scored Kouzmanoff for a run batted in (RBI). Kouzmanoff then hit an RBI single in the third inning that scored first baseman Daric Barton to give the Athletics a 2–0 lead.

In the fourth inning, Bartlett again threatened to end the perfect game when he hit a slow ground ball to Kouzmanoff, who had to make a running throw to an outstretched Barton to record the out. Braden later remarked, "[Kouzmanoff] was literally everywhere that day." After the Athletics extended their lead to 4–0, Braden faced Evan Longoria in the fifth inning. Longoria attempted to bunt for a hit, but the bunt attempt resulted in a foul ball, and Longoria struck out to end the at bat. The bunt attempt drew boos from the crowd, as bunting to break up a perfect game is commonly seen as breaking one of the unwritten rules of baseball. When asked about the bunt, Longoria said, "At that point, you're really not thinking about the guy's perfect game or no-hitter; you're just trying to get back into the game."

In the sixth inning, Braden struck out Aybar and induced two foul pop-ups that were caught by Kouzmanoff. The second pop-up was the result of a 12-pitch at bat from Gabe Kapler. Braden noted it was during Kapler's lengthy at bat that he started to realize the magnitude of his pitching performance. "That's when it kind of hit me," according to Braden. After an uneventful seventh inning, Braden got Longoria to fly out to begin the eighth inning and induced a foul pop-up from Carlos Peña that was caught by Kouzmanoff. The Oakland-Alameda County Coliseum has a notably large foul territory, which allowed Kouzmanoff to sprint after the pop-up and catch it just in front of the Athletics' dugout. After a strikeout to Upton, Braden was perfect through eight innings.

Aybar led off the ninth inning with a soft line drive that was caught by Barton. Dioner Navarro then hit a fly ball that was caught by left fielder Eric Patterson. The final batter of the game was Kapler. With a count of two balls and one strike, Braden threw a pitch that was called a ball by umpire Jim Wolf. Braden believed Wolf had called it a strike and incorrectly assumed the count was two balls and two strikes. Powell wanted Braden to throw a changeup, but Braden instead threw a fastball outside of the strike zone, which Kapler hit to shortstop Cliff Pennington for the final out of the game. Had Kapler not swung, he would have drawn a walk and broken up the perfect game. According to Braden: "If it's 3-1, I'm throwing a changeup 100% of the time. If it's 2-2, like it was in my mind, I'm throwing a fastball, because he's probably looking to cover the changeup. So he got the 87 mph fastball, and I got away with it."

The game lasted 2 hours and 7 minutes, and Braden had thrown 107 pitches. Of the 27 batters he faced, Braden struck out 6; he had a game score of 93.

== Aftermath ==
After recording the final out, Braden celebrated with his teammates on the field. Eventually, his grandmother Peggy Lindsey made her way onto the field, and the two hugged and kissed the Saint Christopher medallion Braden was wearing. Lindsey said to reporters, "Stick it, A-Rod", referring to Alex Rodriguez. Rodriguez responded by saying, "I've learned in my career that it's always better to be remembered for some of the good things you do on the field, and good for him. He threw a perfect game. And, even better, he beat the Rays." Three days later, Braden appeared on the Late Show with David Letterman to read the Top Ten List of thoughts that went through his mind while he threw the perfect game.

Braden would finish the 2010 season with a win-loss record of 11–14 and a 3.50 earned run average (ERA). He would start just three games in 2011 before he needed surgery to repair a torn capsule in his left shoulder. Injuries plagued his career, and after missing two full seasons, Braden announced his retirement in 2014. His career record was 26–36 with a 4.16 ERA. After retirement, Braden became a sports commentator for ESPN and NBC Sports California. In 2023, Braden provided commentary for Domingo Germán's perfect game against the Athletics, making him the only person to have both thrown a perfect game and called a perfect game as a commentator. When asked about the impact the perfect game had on his life, Braden remarked, "Without that, I don't know why I would have an opportunity to start on a national media scale at ESPN. There were just opportunities abound after that night, and I know that it's because I had one good day at work."

== Statistics ==
Statistics taken from Baseball-Reference.com.

=== Linescore ===
Team	1	2	3	4	5	6	7	8	9	R	H	E
Tampa Bay Rays (22–9)	0	0	0	0	0	0	0	0	0	0	0	1
Oakland Athletics (17–15)	0	1	1	2	0	0	0	0	X	4	12	0
WP: Dallas Braden (4–2) LP: James Shields (4–1)

=== Box score ===
Tampa Bay hitting
Tampa Bay	AB	R	H	RBI	BB	SO	AVG
Jason Bartlett, SS	3	0	0	0	0	0	.248
Carl Crawford, LF	3	0	0	0	0	1	.308
Ben Zobrist, 2B	3	0	0	0	0	0	.259
Evan Longoria, 3B	3	0	0	0	0	1	.325
Carlos Peña, 1B	3	0	0	0	0	0	.183
B.J. Upton, CF	3	0	0	0	0	2	.225
Willy Aybar, DH	3	0	0	0	0	2	.273
Dioner Navarro, C	3	0	0	0	0	0	.150
Gabe Kapler, RF	3	0	0	0	0	0	.220
Totals	27	0	0	0	0	6	.000

Tampa Bay pitching
Tampa Bay	IP	H	R	ER	BB	SO	HR	ERA
James Shields (L, 4–1)	6	11	4	2	1	6	0	3.13
Dan Wheeler	1	0	0	0	1	3	0	1.86
Andy Sonnanstine	1	1	0	0	0	0	0	2.51
Totals	8	12	4	2	2	9	0	2.25

Oakland batting
Oakland	AB	R	H	RBI	BB	SO	AVG
Cliff Pennington, SS	5	1	1	0	0	0	.269
Daric Barton, 1B	5	2	3	0	0	0	.296
Ryan Sweeney, RF	4	0	2	1	0	1	.304
Kevin Kouzmanoff, 3B	4	1	2	1	0	2	.275
Eric Chavez, DH	3	0	1	0	1	1	.239
Adam Rosales, 2B	3	0	1	0	1	1	.273
Eric Patterson, LF	4	0	0	0	0	2	.200
Landon Powell, C	4	0	2	1	0	1	.143
Rajai Davis, CF	4	0	0	0	0	1	.227
Totals	36	4	12	3	2	9	.333

Oakland pitching
Oakland	IP	H	R	ER	BB	SO	HR	ERA
Dallas Braden (W, 4–2)	9	0	0	0	0	6	0	3.33
Totals	9	0	0	0	0	6	0	0.00
