= Dallas Braden =

American baseball player and analyst (born 1983)

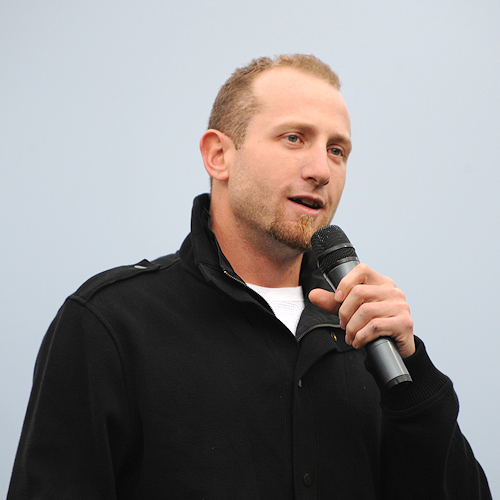
- Braden in 2010
- Pitcher
- Born: August 13, 1983 (age 43); Phoenix, Arizona, U.S.
- Batted: Left Threw: Left

MLB debut
- April 24, 2007, for the Oakland Athletics

Last MLB appearance
- April 16, 2011, for the Oakland Athletics

MLB statistics
- Win–loss record: 26–36
- Earned run average: 4.16
- Strikeouts: 305
- Stats at Baseball Reference

Teams
- Oakland Athletics (2007–2011)

Career highlights and awards
- Pitched a perfect game on May 9, 2010

Dallas Lee Braden (born August 13, 1983) is an American former professional baseball player and television sports commentator. He played in Major League Baseball as a left-handed pitcher from 2007 to 2011 as a member of the Oakland Athletics. Braden pitched the 19th perfect game in Major League Baseball history, on May 9, 2010. The following season, shoulder problems were the first in a series of injuries that forced him to ultimately retire in 2014 after not throwing a pitch for two and a half seasons. After his playing career, Braden became a television baseball analyst.

== Early life ==
Braden was born in Phoenix, Arizona. He played Little League baseball in Stockton, California, in the Hoover Tyler Little League. Braden graduated from Stagg High School in Stockton, where he played baseball and ran cross country. His mother, Jodie Atwood, died of cancer during his senior year. After his mother's death, he lived with his maternal grandmother.

Braden was first drafted by the Atlanta Braves in the 46th round of the 2001 MLB draft, but he did not sign. Braden played two seasons of college baseball at American River College in Sacramento County, California, where he posted a combined record of 12–4 including a complete game against Fresno City College while allowing one hit and striking out 14 batters. He then played one season for the Texas Tech Red Raiders.

== Professional career ==
=== Minor League Baseball ===
The Oakland Athletics selected Braden out of Texas Tech in the 24th round of the 2004 MLB draft. In 2004, Braden began the season with the Class A Short Season Vancouver Canadians. He made eight relief appearances, picking up a pair of victories and was promoted to the Class A Kane County Cougars and pitched exclusively as a starter. He made five starts for Kane County, and posted a 2–1 record.

In 2005, Braden split the season between the Class A-Advanced Stockton Ports and the Double-A Midland RockHounds. He posted a 6–0 record for the Ports, and a 9–5 mark for the RockHounds. His composite total of 15 wins led all A's minor league pitchers and earned him Pitcher of the Year honors for the Athletics organization. He underwent shoulder surgery in the 2005–06 offseason. At the beginning of his minor league career, Braden was known for throwing the screwball; he abandoned it shortly after his shoulder surgery.

Braden began the 2006 season on a rehabilitation assignment with the rookie league Arizona League Athletics. He made six starts, going 2–0 and moved up to Stockton, where was also 2–0 with a 6.23 ERA. He was promoted to Double-A Midland where he made one start, giving up six runs in 3 1/3 innings pitched while receiving a no decision. His composite 2006 numbers were: 4–0 record, 4.10 ERA, 55 strikeouts and eight walks in 37 1/3 innings of work.

Braden began the 2007 season in Double-A Midland and was promoted to the Triple-A Sacramento River Cats after one start.

=== Oakland Athletics ===
When Rich Harden got hurt on April 23, the Athletics promoted Braden to the majors to replace him. On April 24, Braden made his first major league start and picked up the win against the Baltimore Orioles. He went 1–8 that season for Oakland, pitching 72 1/3 innings across 20 games (14 starts) with 55 strikeouts and 26 walks.

In 2008, Braden split time between Triple-A Sacramento and Oakland. He posted an ERA of 4.14 in 19 MLB games (10 starts), pitching 71 2/3 innings with 41 strikeouts and 25 walks. Braden was Oakland's Opening Day starter in 2009, giving up three runs in six innings to the Los Angeles Angels on April 6 and taking the loss. He spent the entire season with Oakland, appearing in 22 games (all starts) while compiling an 8–9 record with 3.89 ERA, pitching 136 2/3 innings with 81 strikeouts at 42 walks.

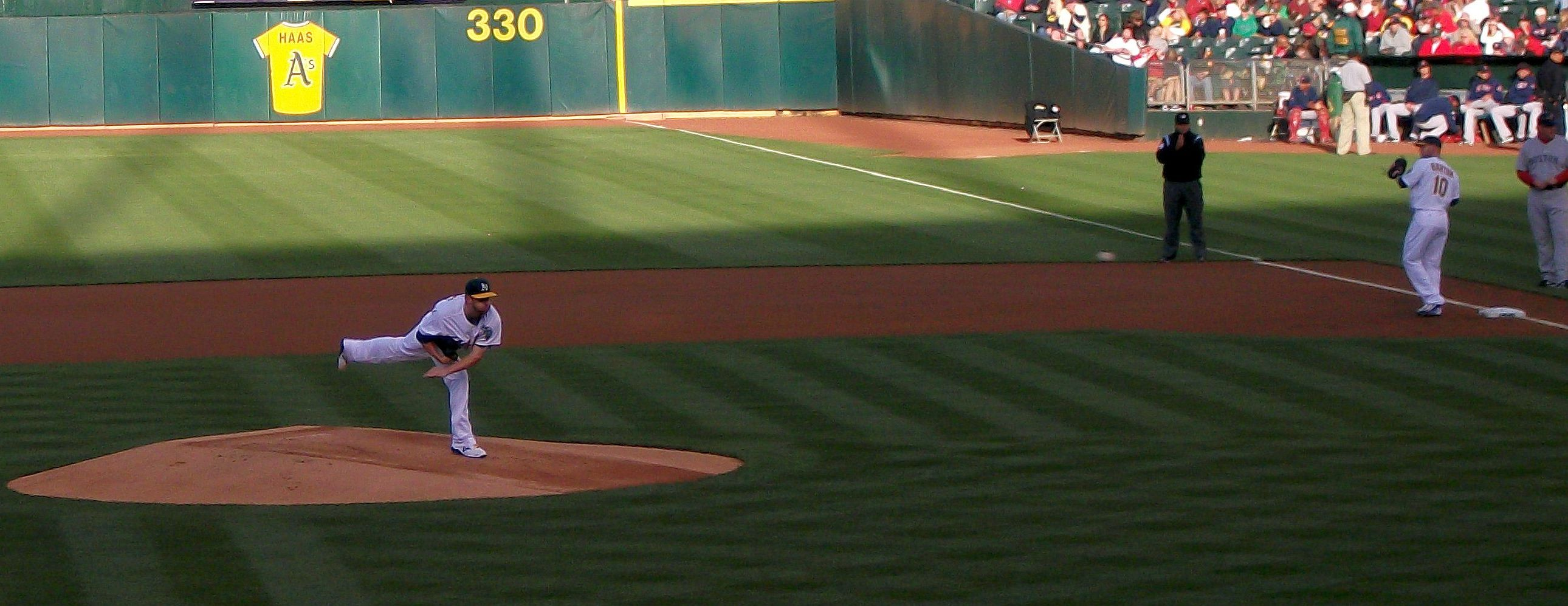
Braden warming up before a game against the Boston Red Sox in 2010

On April 6, 2010, Braden's first outing of the season, he struck out a career high 10 batters in seven innings, allowing one run on four hits and walked one. He received a no-decision, but the team got the win in the tenth inning.

On April 22, Braden was pitching against the New York Yankees when he became angry with Yankees third baseman Alex Rodriguez for breaking an unwritten rule when Rodriguez ran across the pitcher's mound on his way back to first base after a foul ball. At the end of the inning as the players were switching sides, Braden yelled at Rodriguez. Rodriguez offered no apology and later engaged Braden in the press, pointing to his short career and losing record.

On May 9, 2010, Braden pitched the 19th perfect game in MLB history against the Tampa Bay Rays in Oakland. He did it in 109 pitches, 77 of which were strikes, with catcher Landon Powell behind the plate. Braden had lost his mother to melanoma, so pitching the 19th perfect game in major league history was of even greater significance to Braden because he achieved the feat on Mother's Day. 10 years later, Braden claimed to have pitched the game while hung over.

Braden finished the 2010 season with an 11–14 record in 30 starts for the Athletics. He threw five complete games along with two shutouts, pitching a total of 192 2/3 innings with 113 strikeouts at 43 walks.

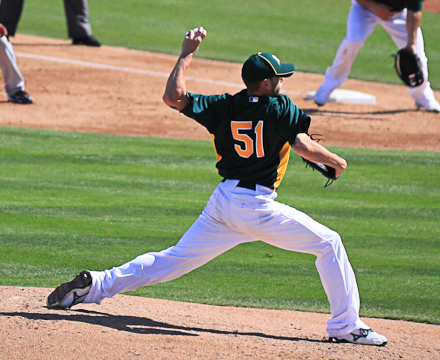
Braden pitching in 2011

Braden made three starts in 2011, with a 1–1 record and 3.00 ERA, before feeling discomfort in his shoulder. He was diagnosed with a torn capsule in his left shoulder and would need immediate surgery. Braden missed the remainder of the 2011 season.

=== Retirement ===
On December 13, 2011, Braden avoided arbitration by signing a one-year deal. He made $3.35 million in guaranteed money, with $400,000 in incentives. Braden missed the entire 2012 season and on August 21, he required an additional surgery, this time to repair the rotator cuff of his shoulder. The surgery would also sideline him for the first half of the 2013 season. Following the season, Braden was let go and he became a free agent. Braden officially announced his retirement on January 14, 2014, citing his arm being a "shredded mess."

=== Career statistics ===
Overall, in his five seasons with Oakland, Braden appeared in 94 MLB games (79 starts), compiling a 26–36 record with 4.16 ERA while pitching 491 1/3 innings with 305 strikeouts and 141 walks. He did not have any postseason appearances, as the Athletics did not have a winning season in any of Braden's years with the team.

Braden threw four pitches: a cutter at 82 MPH, a fastball at 86–88 MPH, a slurve at 72–79 MPH and a changeup at 72 MPH.

== Broadcasting career ==
In 2014, Braden joined ESPN as a Baseball Tonight analyst. The following season, he moved into the broadcast booth as a color analyst on games.

Early in the 2016 season, Braden was moved to ESPN's Monday Night Baseball booth following the network's dismissal of Curt Schilling. Braden was laid off with dozens of other ESPN employees on April 26, 2017.

On July 14, 2017, Braden debuted on NBC Sports California as a new field-level analyst for the A's broadcasts. Since then, he has substituted for Ray Fosse in the TV booth as a color commentator.

In 2017, Braden started a podcast and Facebook Live show, "Starting 9," with co-host Jared Carrabis on Barstool Sports, which lasted until 2021. He also hosts a radio show on Barstool's SiriusXM channel called "Dialed In with Dallas Braden."

In April 2022, he became co-host to Carrabis' new podcast "Baseball Is Dead" for DraftKings, and later Underdog Fantasy.

Braden was criticized for his actions on May 5, 2023, during a broadcast between the A's and the Kansas City Royals. During the game, his broadcast partner Glen Kuiper appeared to have said "nigger league museum" when referring to a visit the two had made earlier in the day to the Negro Leagues Baseball Museum (NLBM) in Kansas City. Braden remained silent after the comment, later telling the media that "the nuances of live television mean that sometimes we, as broadcasters, miss some of what you, our audience, see and hear … In that moment, I missed the live comment, and I was not aware of it until the sixth inning when Glen Kuiper made an apology."

Braden provided color commentary for Domingo Germán's perfect game for NBC Sports California on June 28, 2023.

== Personal life ==
Braden helps give food and money for Charity Communities in Stockton. On Thanksgiving, he personally collects and distributes food for the needy. In 2011, the University of the Pacific in Stockton gave Braden an Annual Community Service Award.

In October 2015, the Los Rios Community College District honored Braden as a distinguished alumnus on behalf of American River College where he was a student and played baseball for two seasons.

== See also ==
- List of Major League Baseball no-hitters

== Bibliography ==
- 2006 Oakland Athletics Media Guide. Pg. 376. Produced by the Oakland Athletics Public Relations Department.

Achievements
Preceded by Mark Buehrle	Perfect game pitcher May 9, 2010	Succeeded by Roy Halladay
Preceded by Ubaldo Jiménez	No-hitter pitcher May 9, 2010	Succeeded by Roy Halladay
