= Jim Joyce =

American baseball umpire (born 1955)

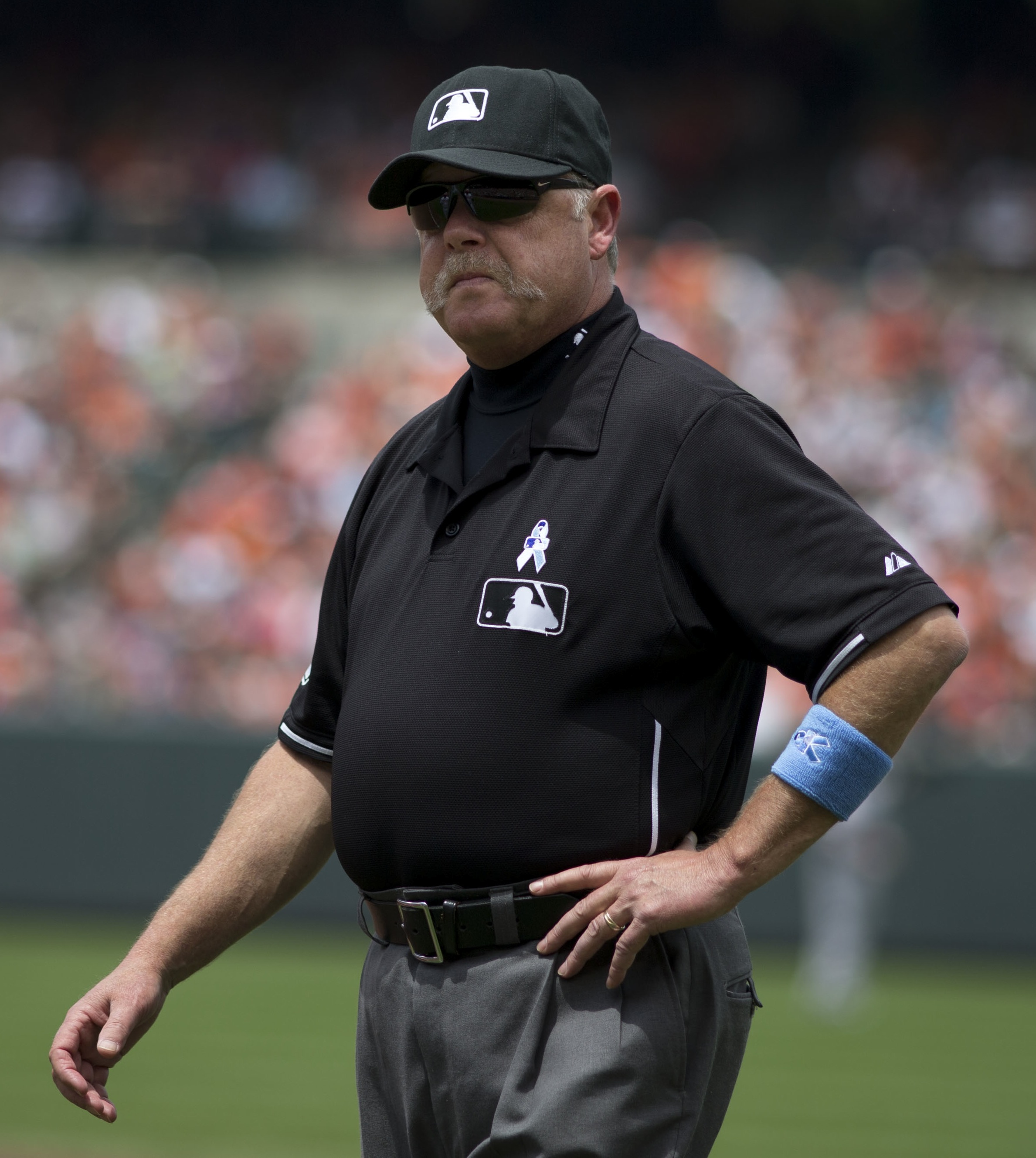
- Joyce in 2013
- Born: October 3, 1955 (age 70); Toledo, Ohio, U.S.

MLB debut
- May 23, 1987

Last appearance
- October 2, 2016

Career highlights and awards
- 3x All-Star Games (1994, 2001, 2012); 10x Division Series (1995, 1998, 1999, 2001, 2002, 2003, 2008, 2009, 2012, 2013); 4x League Championship Series (1997, 2004, 2006, 2007); 3x World Series (1999, 2001, 2013)

James Alfred Joyce III (born October 3, 1955) is an American former professional baseball umpire who worked in the American League (AL) from 1987 to 1999 and throughout Major League Baseball (MLB) from 2000 to 2016. He wore uniform number 6 while in the AL and number 66 for MLB. His loud and enthusiastic strike calls drew comparisons to that of retired umpire Bruce Froemming. Though his umpiring was generally praised by players and coaches, Joyce is best known for his incorrect call in Armando Galarraga's near-perfect game in June 2010.

== Early life ==
Joyce was born in Toledo, Ohio, on October 3, 1955. He grew up in Toledo, where he graduated from Central Catholic High School in 1973. He then attended Bowling Green State University in Bowling Green, Ohio, where he played baseball. In 1977, he graduated from Bowling Green with a Bachelor of Science degree in education.

== Professional career ==
After graduating from Bowling Green State University in 1977, he umpired in the Midwest League (1978–1979), the Florida Instructional League (1978), the Texas League (1980), the Pacific Coast League (1981–1986, 1988), the International League (1987), and the Dominican League (1983). In 1989, Joyce was promoted from the Pacific Coast League to the American League upon the death of MLB umpire Nick Bremigan.

Joyce umpired in the All-Star Game (1994, 2001, and 2012), the Division Series (1995, 1998, 1999, 2001, 2002, 2003, 2008, 2009, 2012, and 2013), the League Championship Series (1997, 2004, 2006, and 2007), and the World Series (1999, 2001, and 2013). ESPN The Magazine released an anonymous poll of 100 current MLB players that voted Joyce the best overall umpire in baseball. For the 2012 season, Joyce served as an interim crew chief due to the absence of the injured John Hirschbeck.

On August 20, 2012, Joyce saved the life of an Arizona Diamondbacks employee by administering CPR to the woman who was in cardiac arrest at Chase Field.

He retired on January 16, 2017.

=== Armando Galarraga's near-perfect game ===
On June 2, 2010, with 2 outs in the 9th inning, as the first base umpire Joyce incorrectly called a runner safe at first base, which cost Armando Galarraga a perfect game. Joyce tearfully spoke with the media following the game and admitted he made a mistake: "I just cost the kid a perfect game." Joyce and Galarraga received praise throughout the sports world for the manner in which they handled the situation; reflecting an earlier ESPN poll, players such as Mariano Rivera spoke on the record about Joyce's superb career of umpiring.

Joyce had been the second-base umpire for Dallas Braden's perfect game on May 9, 2010, less than a month before the Galarraga game. He was also the first base umpire for the no-hitter pitched by Carlos Zambrano on September 14, 2008.

In 2011, Joyce, Galarraga, and author Daniel Paisner collaborated on a book based on the game, Nobody's Perfect: Two Men, One Call, and a Game for Baseball History. Following the book's release, to avoid any appearance of impropriety due to their business relationship, MLB did not allow Joyce to work any games in which Galarraga would be playing.

=== Other notable games ===
In September 1996, Joyce restrained fellow umpire John Hirschbeck when Hirschbeck charged into the Baltimore Orioles clubhouse to confront Roberto Alomar. The day before the confrontation, Alomar had made comments about how Hirschbeck's attitude changed following the death of his son.

Working third base during Game 3 of the 2013 World Series, Joyce determined Allen Craig of the St. Louis Cardinals had been obstructed when Boston Red Sox infielder Will Middlebrooks went diving after an errant throw by catcher Jarrod Saltalamacchia. Craig was then awarded the winning run when home plate umpire Dana DeMuth enforced the obstruction called by Joyce. This is the only case of a World Series game ending on an obstruction call.

== Personal life ==
Joyce, who lives in Washington County, Oregon, is married and has two children. In 2000, he was inducted into his high school's sports hall of fame, and in 2009 he was inducted into the Irish American Baseball Hall of Fame.

== See also ==
- List of Major League Baseball umpires (disambiguation)
