= Charlie Reliford =

American baseball umpire (born 1956)

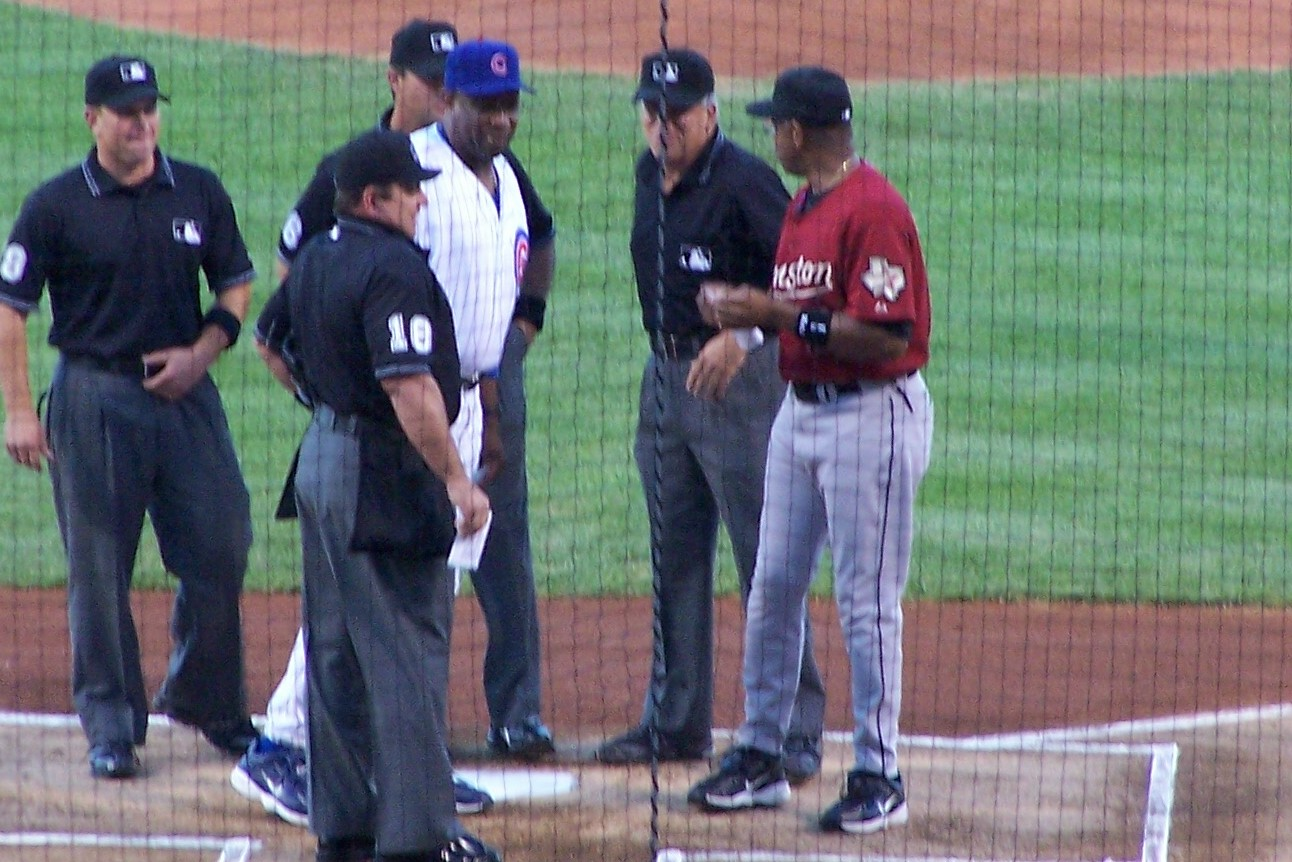
- Reliford (number 18) in 2006
- Born: September 19, 1956 (age 69); Ashland, Kentucky, U.S.
- Occupation: MLB Supervisor of Officials
- Years active: 1989–2009
- Height: 5 ft 9 in (1.75 m)

Charles Harold Reliford (born September 19, 1956) is an American baseball executive in Major League Baseball (MLB) as a Supervisor of Umpires, a role he took in 2009.

From 1989 to 2009, he was a Major League Baseball umpire, originally in the National League (NL) umpire from 1989 to 1999. He wore uniform number 18. Reliford retired from umpiring following the 2009 season, taking a job as a supervisor of umpires.

Reliford began umpiring in the minor leagues in 1982, eventually reaching the Triple-A American Association. He made his NL debut on May 29, 1989.

Reliford officiated in the World Series in 2000 and 2004, and in the All-Star Game in 1996 and 2007. He has also umpired in three League Championship Series (1999, 2001, 2002) and in four Division Series (1995, 1997, 2000, 2004).

In Game 2 of the 2000 World Series, Reliford was the home plate umpire when Mike Piazza of the New York Mets had his bat shatter and fly towards the pitcher's mound on a foul ball. Roger Clemens of the New York Yankees fired the sawed-off piece of the bat toward Piazza, causing both benches to empty and reigniting the controversy that had begun the previous July, when Clemens had hit Piazza in the head with a pitch during an interleague game at Yankee Stadium.

On September 3, 2008, Reliford was the crew chief for the first major league game in history to use instant replay on a boundary home run call. Alex Rodriguez of the New York Yankees had hit a ball near the left field foul pole at Tropicana Field that was ruled a home run by third-base umpire Brian Runge. Although all the umpires agreed with the call, Tampa Bay Rays manager Joe Maddon argued the ball was foul and asked for a review; however, by rule, the decision to review was solely Reliford's to make as the crew chief. After a conversation with the other umpires, Reliford agreed to the replay and after a brief review upheld the initial home run call.

== See also ==
- List of Major League Baseball umpires (disambiguation)
