= 1996 National League Division Series =

American baseball games

Teams
Team (Wins)		Manager	Season
Atlanta Braves (3)		Bobby Cox	96–66 (.593), GA: 8
Los Angeles Dodgers (0)		Bill Russell	90–72 (.556), GB: 1
- Dates: October 2–5
- Television: ESPN (Game 1); Fox (Games 2–3)
- TV announcers: Chris Berman and Buck Martinez (Game 1); Joe Buck and Tim McCarver (Games 2–3)
- Radio: CBS
- Radio announcers: Jerry Coleman and Jim Hunter
- Umpires: Games 1–2: Steve Rippley, Eric Gregg, Tom Hallion, Terry Tata, Bruce Froemming, Bill Hohn; Game 3: Jim Quick, Gerry Davis, Dana DeMuth, Frank Pulli, Harry Wendelstedt, Greg Bonin

Teams
Team (Wins)		Manager	Season
St. Louis Cardinals (3)		Tony La Russa	88–74 (.543), GA: 6
San Diego Padres (0)		Bruce Bochy	91–71 (.562), GA: 1
- Dates: October 1–5
- Television: ESPN (Games 1–2); NBC (Game 3)
- TV announcers: Chris Berman and Buck Martinez (Games 1–2); Bob Costas, Joe Morgan, and Bob Uecker (Game 3)
- Radio: CBS
- Radio announcers: Gene Elston and Gary Cohen
- Umpires: Games 1–2: Jim Quick, Gerry Davis, Dana DeMuth, Frank Pulli, Harry Wendelstedt, Greg Bonin; Game 3: Steve Rippley, Eric Gregg, Tom Hallion, Terry Tata, Bruce Froemming, Bill Hohn

The 1996 National League Division Series (NLDS), consisted of two best-of-five playoff series on the National League side in Major League Baseball's 1996 postseason, began on Tuesday, October 1, and ended on Saturday, October 5, with the champions of the three NL divisions—along with a "wild card" team—participating in two series.

Under MLB's playoff format from 1995 to 1997, home field advantage was assigned to two of the three division champions on a rotating basis, regardless of record. The wild card team was then matched up against whichever of those two home-field division champions held the better record, unless it created an intradivisional matchup, as no two teams from the same division could be matched up in the Division Series, regardless of whether the format at the time would suggest such a matchup. Home field priority for division champions for the 1996 NL postseason was as follows: (1) East, (2) West, (3) Central. The matchups were:

- (1) Atlanta Braves (NL East champions) vs. (4) Los Angeles Dodgers (Wild Card qualifier): Braves won the series, 3–0.
- (2) San Diego Padres (NL West champions) vs. (3) St. Louis Cardinals (NL Central champions): Cardinals won the series, 3–0.

The team with home field "advantage" was required to play the first two games on the road, with potentially the last three at home, in order to reduce travel.

The Braves and Cardinals went on to meet in the NL Championship Series (NLCS). The Braves would rally to win that series four games to three and become the National League champion, but would lose to the American League champion New York Yankees in the 1996 World Series.

== Matchups ==
=== San Diego Padres vs. St. Louis Cardinals ===
St. Louis won the series, 3–0.

Game	Date	Score	Location	Time	Attendance
1	October 1	San Diego Padres – 1, St. Louis Cardinals – 3	Busch Stadium (II)	2:39	54,193
2	October 3	San Diego Padres – 4, St. Louis Cardinals – 5	Busch Stadium (II)	2:55	56,752
3	October 5	St. Louis Cardinals – 7, San Diego Padres – 5	Jack Murphy Stadium	3:32	53,899

=== Atlanta Braves vs. Los Angeles Dodgers ===
Atlanta won the series, 3–0.

Game	Date	Score	Location	Time	Attendance
1	October 2	Atlanta Braves – 2, Los Angeles Dodgers – 1 (10)	Dodger Stadium	3:08	47,428
2	October 3	Atlanta Braves – 3, Los Angeles Dodgers – 2	Dodger Stadium	2:08	51,916
3	October 5	Los Angeles Dodgers – 2, Atlanta Braves – 5	Atlanta–Fulton County Stadium	3:19	52,529

== San Diego vs. St. Louis ==
=== Game 1 ===
October 1, 1996 3:08 pm (CDT) at Busch Stadium (II) in St. Louis, Missouri 80 °F (27 °C), sunny
Team	1	2	3	4	5	6	7	8	9	R	H	E
San Diego	0	0	0	0	0	1	0	0	0	1	8	1
St. Louis	3	0	0	0	0	0	0	0	X	3	6	0
WP: Todd Stottlemyre (1–0) LP: Joey Hamilton (0–1) Sv: Dennis Eckersley (1); Home runs: SD: Rickey Henderson (1); STL: Gary Gaetti (1); Attendance: 54,193; Boxscore

The Cardinals and Padres met for the first time in the postseason. A three-run home run by Gary Gaetti off Joey Hamilton in the first inning put the Cardinals up for good, despite being shut out by Hamilton for the next five innings. Todd Stottlemyre pitched masterfully, allowing only a home run by Rickey Henderson. Rick Honeycutt and Dennis Eckersley shut the Padres down for the win.

=== Game 2 ===
October 3, 1996 3:08 pm (CDT) at Busch Stadium (II) in St. Louis, Missouri 64 °F (18 °C), sunny
Team	1	2	3	4	5	6	7	8	9	R	H	E
San Diego	0	0	0	0	1	2	0	1	0	4	6	0
St. Louis	0	0	1	0	3	0	0	1	X	5	5	1
WP: Rick Honeycutt (1–0) LP: Doug Bochtler (0–1) Sv: Dennis Eckersley (2); Home runs: SD: Ken Caminiti (1); STL: None; Attendance: 56,752; Boxscore

A well fought Game 2 saw the Cardinals squander two leads. Scott Sanders faced Andy Benes, a former Padre. Willie McGee put the Cardinals on top on the third with an RBI single after two walks. Ken Caminiti tied the game with a leadoff home run in the fifth. In the bottom of the inning, Sanders allowed two singles and a walk to load the bases with one out before Ron Gant cleared them with a double off Dario Veras to make it 4–1 Cardinals. In the sixth, after back-to-back one-out singles, a two-run single by Tony Gwynn aided by center fielder Willie McGee's throwing error made it a one-run game in the Padres sixth. In the eighth, Benes allowed a leadoff single and walk. A sacrifice bunt moved the runners up off Rick Honeycutt before an RBI ground out by Steve Finley tied the game, but in the bottom half, Doug Bochtler walked two and threw a wild pitch to put runners on second and third with one out. Tom Pagnozzi's ground out off Trevor Hoffman scored Brian Jordan and put the Cardinals up 5–4. Dennis Eckersley got his second save of the postseason with a perfect ninth.

=== Game 3 ===
October 5, 1996 5:07 pm (CDT) at Jack Murphy Stadium in San Diego, California 70 °F (21 °C), sunny
Team	1	2	3	4	5	6	7	8	9	R	H	E
St. Louis	1	0	0	0	0	3	1	0	2	7	13	0
San Diego	0	2	1	1	0	0	0	1	0	5	11	2
WP: T.J. Mathews (1–0) LP: Trevor Hoffman (0–1) Sv: Dennis Eckersley (3); Home runs: STL: Ron Gant (1), Brian Jordan (1); SD: Ken Caminiti 2 (3); Attendance: 53,899; Boxscore

In Game 3, the Cardinals looked to Donovan Osborne to put the Padres away. Opposing the potential sweep was Andy Ashby. Brian Jordan put the Cardinals ahead when he singled to center field to score Royce Clayton, who walked to lead off and moved to second on a single. After back-to-back one-out singles, Chris Gomez's fielder's choice and Jody Reed's double scored a run each to put the Padres up 2–1. Then Ken Caminiti homered to make it 3–1 in the third. An RBI single in the bottom of the fourth by Reed after back-to-back leadoff singles made it 4–1 Padres and Osborne was done. A leadoff homer by Ron Gant made it 4–2 in the sixth. Then, Jordan singled, stole second, and scored on a one-out triple by John Mabry. Tim Worrell relieved Ashby and allowed an RBI single to Tom Pagnozzi to tie the game at four. The Cardinals would take the lead in the seventh when Ray Lankford scored on a bases-loaded double play by Gant. Caminiti's second home run of the game off Rick Honeycutt tied the game in the eighth, However, after a walk in the ninth, Jordan hit a two-run home run off Trevor Hoffman that proved to be the series winner. A one-out single by Rickey Henderson in the ninth put the tying run at the plate but nothing would be made of it as Eckersley got his third save in as many tries to win the series.

=== Composite box ===
1996 NLDS (3–0): St. Louis Cardinals over San Diego Padres

Team	1	2	3	4	5	6	7	8	9	R	H	E
St. Louis Cardinals	4	0	1	0	3	3	1	1	2	15	24	1
San Diego Padres	0	2	1	1	1	3	0	2	0	10	25	3
Total attendance: 164,844 Average attendance: 54,948

== Atlanta vs. Los Angeles ==
=== Game 1 ===
October 2, 1996 1:07 pm (PDT) at Dodger Stadium in Los Angeles, California 76 °F (24 °C), sunny
Team	1	2	3	4	5	6	7	8	9	10	R	H	E
Atlanta	0	0	0	1	0	0	0	0	0	1	2	4	1
Los Angeles	0	0	0	0	1	0	0	0	0	0	1	5	0
WP: John Smoltz (1–0) LP: Antonio Osuna (0–1) Sv: Mark Wohlers (1); Home runs: ATL: Javy López (1); LAD: None; Attendance: 47,428; Boxscore

The Braves were heavy favorites against the Dodgers, who sneaked into the playoffs on a Wild Card berth. This would be manager Bill Russell's only postseason series as Dodgers manager.

The Braves sent 24-game winner John Smoltz to the mound for Game 1. Opposing Smoltz would be Ramón Martínez. The Braves struck first when Fred McGriff's sacrifice fly brought Marquis Grissom, who singled to lead off, stole second and moved to third on a groundout, home in the fourth. Todd Hollandsworth tied the game with an RBI-double in the fifth after a lead off double by Greg Gagne. Smoltz and Martinez dueled for eight innings, when Martinez left the game. When the game moved to extra innings, eventual playoff MVP Javy López hit the go-ahead home run in the tenth off Antonio Osuna. Mark Wohlers recorded the save and the Braves led the series 1–0.

=== Game 2 ===
October 3, 1996 5:07 pm (PDT) at Dodger Stadium in Los Angeles, California 75 °F (24 °C), sunny
Team	1	2	3	4	5	6	7	8	9	R	H	E
Atlanta	0	1	0	0	0	0	2	0	0	3	5	2
Los Angeles	1	0	0	1	0	0	0	0	0	2	3	0
WP: Greg Maddux (1–0) LP: Ismael Valdez (0–1) Sv: Mark Wohlers (2); Home runs: ATL: Ryan Klesko (1), Fred McGriff (1), Jermaine Dye (1); LAD: None; Attendance: 51,916; Boxscore

Greg Maddux faced Ismael Valdez in Game 2. Another pitcher's duel took place. Todd Hollandsworth singled to lead off the first and moved to second on a Ryan Klesko error. Hollandsworth moved to third on a groundout, then scored on Mike Piazza's groundout. However, Klesko homered with one out in the top half to tie the game at one. The Dodgers took the lead again when Piazza singled to lead off the fourth and moved to second on an error by Marquis Grissom, then Raul Mondesi's RBI double made it 2–1 Dodgers. Valdez had pitched six innings when Fred McGriff led off the seventh inning with a home run to tie the game at two. After Klesko was called out on strikes, Jermaine Dye hit a home run to give the Braves a 3–2 lead to knock Valdez out of the game and give him the loss. Mark Wohlers got another save in the ninth as the Braves now led the series 2–0 going home.

=== Game 3 ===
October 5, 1996 4:16 pm (EDT) at Atlanta–Fulton County Stadium in Atlanta, Georgia 65 °F (18 °C), sunny
Team	1	2	3	4	5	6	7	8	9	R	H	E
Los Angeles	0	0	0	0	0	0	1	1	0	2	6	1
Atlanta	1	0	0	4	0	0	0	0	X	5	7	0
WP: Tom Glavine (1–0) LP: Hideo Nomo (0–1) Sv: Mark Wohlers (3); Home runs: LAD: None; ATL: Chipper Jones (1); Attendance: 52,529; Boxscore

Hideo Nomo faced Tom Glavine for Game 3. The night would sour for Nomo as he gave up a first-inning run, thanks to a McGriff double that scored Chipper Jones, who singled with two outs, and squandered the series in the fourth. Glavine doubled with two outs, then Grissom walked. A double by Mark Lemke scored both Glavine and Grissom. Then Jones homered to put the Braves up 5–0. Nomo was finished and so were the Dodgers. They would scratch out a run apiece in the seventh (on Juan Castro's double to score Greg Gagne, who singled with two outs) and eighth (on Mike Piazza's sacrifice fly off Mike Bielecki after Greg McMichael allowed a leadoff walk and subsequent double), and brought the tying run to the plate, but failed to get closer. Wohlers got his third save in as many tries to end the series after retiring the Dodgers in order.

=== Composite box ===
1996 NLDS (3–0): Atlanta Braves over Los Angeles Dodgers

Team	1	2	3	4	5	6	7	8	9	10	R	H	E
Atlanta Braves	1	1	0	5	0	0	2	0	0	1	10	16	3
Los Angeles Dodgers	1	0	0	1	1	0	1	1	0	0	5	14	1
Total attendance: 151,873 Average attendance: 50,624
