= Harry Wendelstedt =

American baseball umpire (1938-2012)

- Umpire
- Born: July 27, 1938; Baltimore, Maryland, U.S.
- Died: March 9, 2012 (aged 73); Daytona Beach, Florida, U.S.

MLB debut
- April 13, 1966

Last MLB appearance
- September 27, 1998

Career highlights and awards
- Special Assignments: All-Star Game (1968, 1976, 1983, 1992); Division Series (1995, 1996, 1997); League Championship Series (1970, 1972, 1977, 1981, 1982, 1988, 1990); World Series (1973, 1980, 1986, 1991, 1995)

Harry Hunter Wendelstedt Jr. (July 27, 1938 – March 9, 2012) was an American umpire in Major League Baseball who worked in the National League from 1966 to 1998. He was born in Baltimore, Maryland. Wendelstedt umpired in the World Series in 1973, 1980, 1986, 1991 and 1995, serving as crew chief in 1980 and 1995. He also officiated in seven National League Championship Series (1970, 1972, 1977, 1981, 1982, 1988, 1990), four All-Star games (1968, 1976, 1983, 1992), and three National League Division Series (1995, 1996, 1997).

Wendelstedt called balls and strikes in five no-hitters, tying an NL record held by Bill Klem. As a home plate umpire, Wendelstedt was known for keeping a wide strike zone. He wore uniform number 21.

== Major League Baseball career ==
On May 31, 1968, Wendelstedt made a call that preserved Los Angeles Dodgers pitcher Don Drysdale's consecutive shutouts and scoreless innings streaks. San Francisco Giants catcher Dick Dietz came to the plate in the top of the 9th inning with the bases loaded and no outs. On a 2–2 count, Drysdale hit Dietz on the elbow, apparently forcing in a run that would have ended the streaks. However, Wendelstedt ruled that Dietz made no attempt to avoid being struck by the pitch, and called him back. Drysdale retired Dietz on a short fly ball and got out of the inning without yielding a run, earning his fifth straight shutout.

When the Pittsburgh Pirates debuted a video board at Three Rivers Stadium, Wendelstedt and other umpires contended that the Pirates purposely replayed close calls and missed calls, making the umpires look bad and putting them at risk of harm from angry fans. Wendelstedt went so far as to threaten to strike unless the Pirates stopped showing such replays.

On October 8, 1988, in Game 3 of the 1988 National League Championship Series, Wendelstedt, the crew chief, ejected Los Angeles Dodgers pitcher Jay Howell from the game for having pine tar on his glove after New York Mets manager Davey Johnson asked the umpires to check Howell. Howell was later suspended for the rest of the series.

Wendelstedt's son, Harry Hunter Wendelstedt III, followed in his father's footsteps and became a major league umpire. The younger Wendelstedt goes by his middle name of "Hunter" professionally. To honor his father, Hunter also wears uniform number 21.

== Umpire training ==
In 1977, Wendelstedt took over control of the Al Somers Umpire School from its founder (who had trained Wendelstedt), renaming it the Harry Wendelstedt Umpire School. He ran the school until his death and it continues to bear his name. His son Hunter now leads the school, located in Ormond Beach, Florida.

== Death ==
Wendelstedt died at the age of 73 on March 9, 2012, after suffering from brain cancer for several years.
