= Tom Hallion =

American baseball umpire (born 1956)

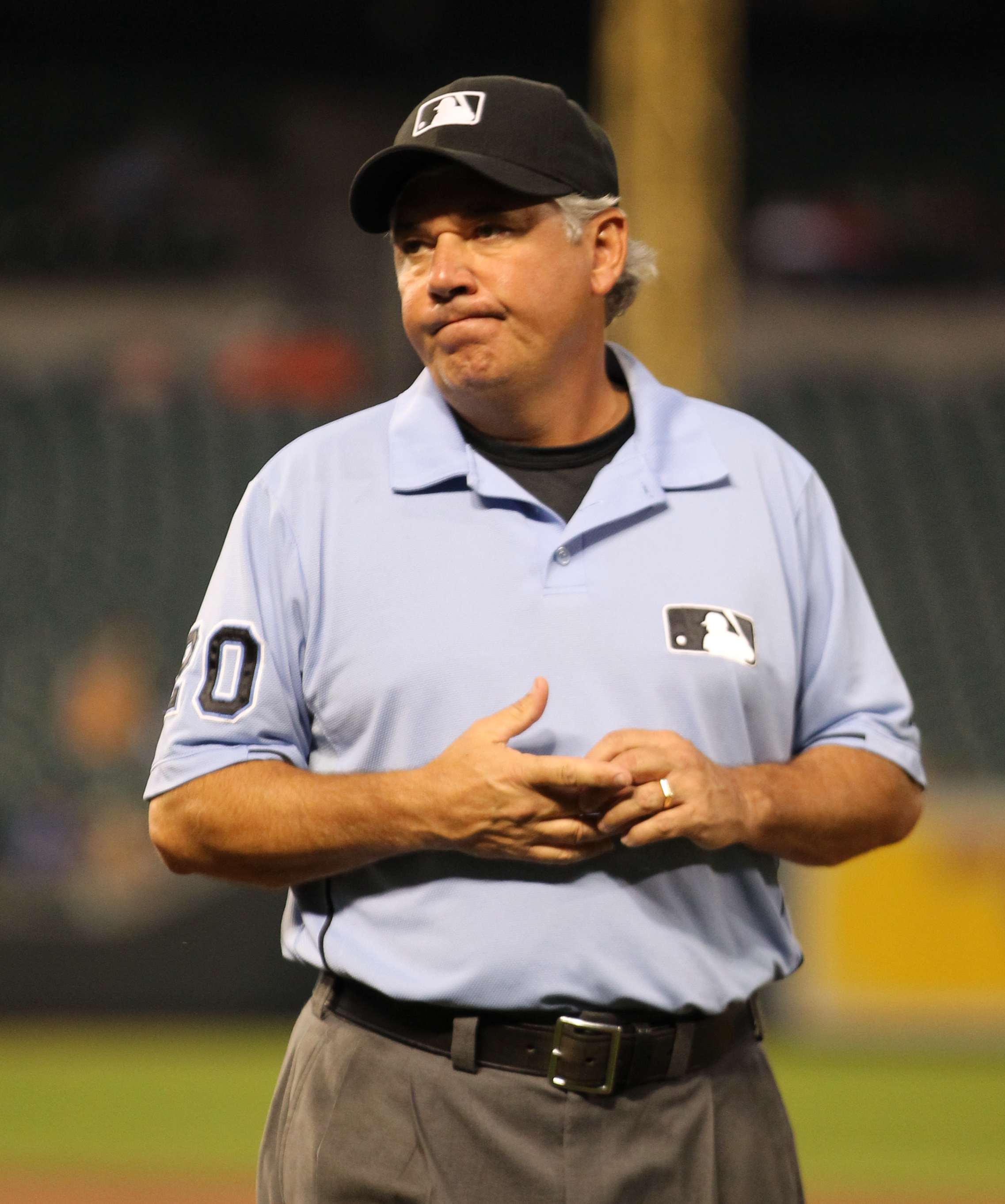
- Hallion in 2011
- Born: September 5, 1956 (age 69); Kingston, New York, U.S.

MLB debut
- June 10, 1985

Last appearance
- October 5, 2022

Career highlights and awards
- Special Assignments: World Baseball Classic (2006); All-Star Game (1992, 2008, 2021); Division Series (1996, 1997, 2008, 2012, 2013, 2014, 2018, 2019, 2021); League Championship Series (1998, 2007, 2009, 2010, 2011); World Series (2008, 2021); Hawaii Series (1997)

Thomas Francis Hallion (born September 5, 1956) is an American retired Major League Baseball umpire who worked in the National League (NL) from 1985 to 1999 and in both major leagues from 2005 until 2022. He was promoted to crew chief in 2010. Hallion has worn number 20 during his MLB career. He resigned from the NL in 1999 as part of a failed mass bargaining strategy, but he was rehired by MLB before the 2005 season.

== Early and personal life ==
Hallion was born on September 5, 1956, to Alice Golding Hallion (March 20, 1926 – March 25, 2007) and Francis Joseph Hallion (December 1, 1923 – February 21, 1999) in Kingston, New York, and grew up in Saugerties, New York. He has two sisters, Kathy Cotich and Maribeth, and a brother, Francis Joseph Jr.

Hallion's father served in the United States Navy during World War II; his uncles Vincent and James T. Hallion in the United States Army; and uncle Edward Hallion in the United States Coast Guard. His father also worked for the Ulster County Department of Public Works for 27 years and as a town councilman in Saugerties from 1964 to 1977.

Hallion attended the University at Buffalo. He married Elizabeth "Betsy" Carnright on September 11, 1983, in Saugerties. They have three children, Corey Nicholas Hallion (b. 1985), Kyle Matthew Hallion (b. 1988) and Jacob Carnright Hallion (b. 1995), and reside in Louisville, Kentucky.

== Umpiring career ==
While a student at the University at Buffalo, Hallion got his first umpiring job through his friend Jack Keeley; he worked games for the Saugerties Athletic Association softball league. In 1979, he attended Bill Kinnamon Umpiring School.

He began his professional umpiring career in the New York–Penn League (1979), which was followed by stints in the Carolina League (1980–81), Eastern League (1982) and American Association (1983–85) before joining the NL staff. He was among the umpires who lost their jobs after resigning as part of a failed union bargaining strategy in 1999, but he was rehired in a December 2004 settlement with MLB.

He officiated in the World Series in 2008 and 2021, the League Championship Series in 1998, 2007, 2009, 2010, and 2011, and in the Division Series in 1996, 1997, 2008, 2012, 2013, 2014, 2018, 2019 and 2021. He has also worked the All-Star Game in 1992, 2008 (at second base during the record 15-inning game), and 2021.

In 2013, Hallion was fined by MLB for swearing at pitcher David Price. Price said in a post-game interview that Hallion swore at him, which led Hallion to state Price was a liar.

Hallion was known for his exciting and demonstrative strikeout signal in which he twisted his body 180 degrees, which earned him the nickname "Tornado Tom". Hallion wore uniform number 20 during his NL career (previously worn by Ed Vargo, who hired Hallion into the Senior Circuit) and retained the number when he rejoined the MLB umpire staff in 2005 (ironically, the umpire who wore #20 in the American League, Dale Ford, also lost his job as part of the failed bargaining strategy; unlike Hallion, Ford never returned to the field). He retired at the conclusion of the 2022 season.

=== Notable games ===
Hallion was the home plate umpire on July 12, 1997, when Francisco Córdova and Ricardo Rincón of the Pittsburgh Pirates combined on a 3–0, 10-inning no-hitter against the Houston Astros.

In 2009, he was the home plate umpire for the first game at the New Yankee Stadium. On July 10 of that season, Hallion was the first base umpire when San Francisco Giants pitcher Jonathan Sánchez no-hit the San Diego Padres.

On June 8, 2010, he was behind the plate when Stephen Strasburg struck out 14 batters in his MLB debut. Hallion was the second base umpire for Henderson Álvarez's no-hitter on September 29, 2013.

Hallion umpired in international play several times. He worked the 2006 World Baseball Classic and was the home plate umpire for the championship game between Japan and Cuba. His crew was also selected to umpire the 2012 MLB Japan Series between the Seattle Mariners and Oakland Athletics. Hallion was the home-plate umpire for the first of the two games.

A leaked recording from May 28, 2016, showed Hallion's heated argument with New York Mets manager Terry Collins after pitcher Noah Syndergaard was ejected by home plate umpire Adam Hamari for throwing a fastball behind Chase Utley, presumably as a response to Utley's slide in the previous year's NLDS which injured Mets shortstop Rubén Tejada. The recording went viral as it offered an uncensored view into an on-field interaction between an umpire and a manager.

== See also ==
- List of Major League Baseball umpires (disambiguation)
