= Greg Bonin =

American baseball umpire (born 1955)

- Born: Gregory Louis Bonin; June 15, 1955 (age 70); Lafayette, Louisiana, U.S.
- Occupation: Umpire
- Years active: 1984-1999 (NL) 2000-2001 (MLB)
- Employer(s): National League, Major League Baseball

Gregory Louis Bonin (born June 15, 1955) is an American former professional baseball umpire. Bonin worked in the National League from 1984 to 1999, and in both major leagues in 2000 and 2001, wearing uniform number 34 for his entire career. He umpired in 1,746 major league games in his 18-year career. He umpired in one All-Star Game (1991), one National League Championship Series (1998), and two Division Series, 1996 and 1997.

== Dennis Martínez perfect game ==
Bonin was the third base umpire for Dennis Martínez' perfect game for the Montreal Expos vs. the Los Angeles Dodgers at Dodger Stadium July 28, 1991.

Originally, Bonin was scheduled to work home plate for this game, but Ed Montague was injured during the fourth inning of a game in San Francisco three days earlier and forced to miss a week of games. During the game in which Montague was injured, crew chief Bruce Froemming moved from second base to the plate, and when the crew moved to Los Angeles for the Expos-Dodgers series, the crew rotated as if Froemming worked the entire game behind the plate, and thus moving up Bonin's next plate assignment by one day. Larry Poncino ended up calling balls and strikes for Martinez' gem.

== Health problems ==
In a 2008 interview for USA Today, Bonin discussed ongoing health effects and memory problems that had plagued him since head injuries had ended his umpiring career. Bonin took three blows to the head over his last three seasons; the first two caused Bonin to miss significant time on the field and the third led to his retirement in 2001.

== See also ==
- List of Major League Baseball umpires (disambiguation)
