= Brian Gorman =

American baseball umpire (born 1959)

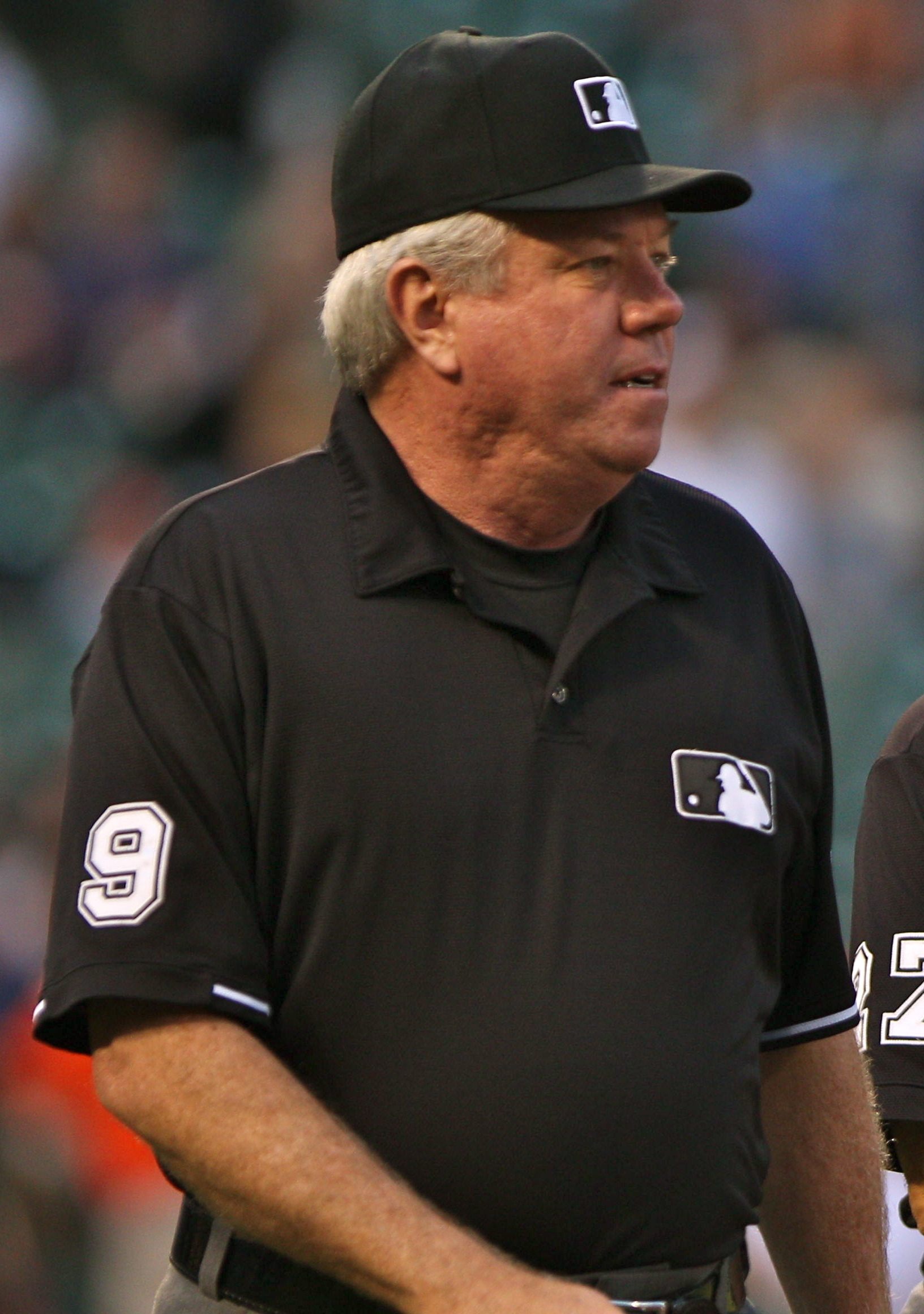
- Gorman in 2012
- Born: June 11, 1959 (age 66); Whitestone, Queens, New York, U.S.

debut
- April 24, 1991

Last appearance
- September 30, 2021

Career highlights and awards
- Special Assignments: All-Star Game (1998, 2009); Wild Card Game (2014); Division Series (1997, 1999, 2000, 2001, 2003, 2004, 2006, 2009, 2011, 2012); League Championship Series (2002, 2007, 2008, 2010, 2014, 2016, 2018); World Series (2004, 2009, 2012)

Brian Scott Gorman (born June 11, 1959) is an American former umpire in Major League Baseball. After working in the National League from 1991 to 1999, he umpired in both leagues from 2000-2021. Gorman was promoted to crew chief in 2010. He is the son of Tom Gorman, who served as an NL umpire from 1951 to 1977. He wore uniform number 9 throughout his career.

Born in Whitestone, Queens, he moved with his family as a child to Closter, New Jersey.

After graduating from the University of Delaware, he began umpiring in the minor leagues in 1982, eventually reaching the American Association before being promoted to the NL. He umpired in three World Series (2004, 2009, 2012) and in two All-Star Games (1998 and 2009). He has also umpired in the 2014 National League Wild Card Game, seven American League Championship Series (2002, 2007, 2008, 2010, 2014, 2016, 2018), and in 10 Division Series (1997, 1999, 2000, 2001, 2003, 2004, 2006, 2009, 2011, 2012).

During Game 3 of the 2012 ALDS, Gorman was the home plate umpire when Raúl Ibañez hit a game-tying and game-winning home run for the New York Yankees against the Baltimore Orioles. The Yankees would win the ALDS in 5 games.

On May 23, 2002, Gorman was the plate umpire for Shawn Green's four-homer game.

Gorman was the plate umpire for a World Baseball Classic game on March 9, 2013, between Canada and Mexico. After a benches–clearing brawl in the 9th inning, Gorman would issue a total of eight ejections, a national-team baseball record.

He retired from baseball at the end of the 2021 season.

== See also ==
- List of Major League Baseball umpires (disambiguation)
