= 1997 National League Division Series =

American baseball games

Teams
Team (Wins)		Manager	Season
Florida Marlins (3)		Jim Leyland	92–70 (.568), GB: 9
San Francisco Giants (0)		Dusty Baker	90–72 (.556), GA: 2
- Dates: September 30–October 3
- Television: ESPN (Games 1–2); NBC (Game 3)
- TV announcers: Chris Berman and Ray Knight (Games 1–2); Bob Costas, Joe Morgan, and Bob Uecker (Game 3)
- Radio: CBS
- Radio announcers: Jerry Coleman and Hank Greenwald
- Umpires: Games 1–2: Mark Hirschbeck, Gary Darling, Tom Hallion, Dana DeMuth, Terry Tata, Brian Gorman; Game 3: Greg Bonin, Ed Rapuano, Charlie Reliford, Steve Rippley, Harry Wendelstedt, Ángel Hernández

Teams
Team (Wins)		Manager	Season
Atlanta Braves (3)		Bobby Cox	101–61 (.623), GA: 9
Houston Astros (0)		Larry Dierker	84–78 (.519), GA: 5
- Dates: September 30–October 3
- Television: ESPN
- TV announcers: Jon Miller, Joe Morgan (Game 1), and Reggie Jackson (Games 2–3)
- Radio: CBS
- Radio announcers: Gene Elston and Gary Cohen
- Umpires: Games 1–2: Greg Bonin, Ed Rapuano, Charlie Reliford, Steve Rippley, Harry Wendelstedt, Ángel Hernández; Game 3: Mark Hirschbeck, Gary Darling, Tom Hallion, Dana DeMuth, Terry Tata, Brian Gorman

The 1997 National League Division Series (NLDS), consisted of two best-of-five playoff series on the National League side in Major League Baseball’s (MLB) 1997 postseason, began on Tuesday, September 30, and ended on Friday, October 3, with the champions of the three NL divisions along with a "wild card" team—participating in two series.

Under MLB's playoff format from 1995 to 1997, home field advantage was assigned to two of the three division champions on a rotating basis, regardless of record. The wild card team was then matched up against whichever of those two home-field division champions held the better record, unless it created an intradivisional matchup, as no two teams from the same division could be matched up in the Division Series, regardless of whether the format at the time would suggest such a matchup. Home field priority for division champions for the 1997 NL postseason was as follows: (1) West, (2) Central, (3) East. The matchups were:

- (1) San Francisco Giants (NL West champions) vs. (4) Florida Marlins (Wild Card qualifier): Marlins won the series, 3–0.
- (2) Houston Astros (NL Central champions) vs. (3) Atlanta Braves (NL East champions): Braves won the series, 3–0.

The team with home field "advantage" was required to play the first two games on the road, with potentially the last three at home, in order to reduce travel.

The Braves and Marlins went on to meet in the NL Championship Series (NLCS). The Marlins became the National League champions, and defeated the American League champion Cleveland Indians in the 1997 World Series.

== Matchups ==
=== San Francisco Giants vs. Florida Marlins ===
Florida won the series, 3–0.

Game	Date	Score	Location	Time	Attendance
1	September 30	San Francisco Giants – 1, Florida Marlins – 2	Pro Player Stadium	2:48	42,167
2	October 1	San Francisco Giants – 6, Florida Marlins – 7	Pro Player Stadium	3:12	41,283
3	October 3	Florida Marlins – 6, San Francisco Giants – 2	3Com Park at Candlestick Point	3:22	57,188

=== Houston Astros vs. Atlanta Braves ===
Atlanta won the series, 3–0.

Game	Date	Score	Location	Time	Attendance
1	September 30	Houston Astros – 1, Atlanta Braves – 2	Turner Field	2:15	46,467
2	October 1	Houston Astros – 3, Atlanta Braves – 13	Turner Field	3:06	49,200
3	October 3	Atlanta Braves – 4, Houston Astros – 1	Astrodome	2:35	53,688

== San Francisco vs. Florida ==
The San Francisco Giants made it back to the postseason for the first time since the 1989 World Series. The Florida Marlins were in the postseason for the first time ever.

=== Game 1 ===
September 30, 1997 4:08 pm (EDT) at Pro Player Stadium in Miami Gardens, Florida 83 °F (28 °C), overcast, drizzle
Team	1	2	3	4	5	6	7	8	9	R	H	E
San Francisco	0	0	0	0	0	0	1	0	0	1	4	0
Florida	0	0	0	0	0	0	1	0	1	2	7	0
WP: Dennis Cook (1–0) LP: Julián Tavárez (0–1); Home runs: SF: Bill Mueller (1); FLA: Charles Johnson (1); Attendance: 46,467; Boxscore

Game 1 was a matchup between Kirk Rueter and Kevin Brown. Both pitchers were on even terms, allowing one run and four hits through seven innings. Both teams struck in the seventh with leadoff homers by Bill Mueller and Charles Johnson. The game was tied 1–1 in the bottom of the ninth inning With the bases loaded, Édgar Rentería singled to right to give the Marlins their first ever postseason win with a walk-off. Rentería would later in his career help the Giants win their first World Series in San Francisco in 2010 by winning a World Series MVP.

=== Game 2 ===
October 1, 1997 4:07 pm (EDT) at Pro Player Stadium in Miami Gardens, Florida 83 °F (28 °C), overcast
Team	1	2	3	4	5	6	7	8	9	R	H	E
San Francisco	1	1	1	1	0	0	1	0	1	6	11	0
Florida	2	0	1	2	0	1	0	0	1	7	10	2
WP: Robb Nen (1–0) LP: Roberto Hernández (0–1); Home runs: SF: Brian Johnson (1); FLA: Bobby Bonilla (1), Gary Sheffield (1); Attendance: 49,200; Boxscore

Shawn Estes faced Al Leiter in an exciting Game 2. An RBI single by Mark Lewis made it 1–0 Giants in the first. The Marlins would strike back in the bottom half. Bobby Bonilla hit a two-run homer to make it 2–1 Marlins, but a homer by Brian Johnson tied the game in the second. Then Barry Bonds hit a sacrifice fly to give the Giants a 3–2 lead in the third. The Marlins tied it in the bottom half with an RBI single by Bonilla. Stan Javier's infield hit gave the Giants the lead back in the fourth. Hits by Alex Arias and Kurt Abbott gave the Marlins the lead in the bottom half. The Marlins would add another run on a homer by Gary Sheffield in the bottom of the sixth. It was 6–4, but the Giants refused to concede. An RBI double by Bonds made it a one-run game in the seventh. The one-run lead would stand into the ninth. With Robb Nen pitching, the Giants managed to tie the game thanks to a key error by Craig Counsell. However, the Marlins would not wait until extra innings to try to win. Sheffield led the inning off with a single; then he stole second. After Bonilla walked, Moisés Alou hit the game-winning single to center field. The ball was scooped up by Dante Powell, whose throw home was in line with home plate, but the ball hit the mound, allowing Sheffield to score easily. This play would be the defining moment of the series, being replayed many times on highlights, as well as mainstream shows such as Live with Regis and Kathie Lee. The Marlins took a 2–0 series lead.

=== Game 3 ===
October 3, 1997 5:08 pm (PDT) at 3Com Park at Candlestick Point in San Francisco, California 68 °F (20 °C), sunny
Team	1	2	3	4	5	6	7	8	9	R	H	E
Florida	0	0	0	0	0	4	0	2	0	6	10	2
San Francisco	0	0	0	1	0	1	0	0	0	2	7	0
WP: Alex Fernandez (1–0) LP: Wilson Álvarez (0–1); Home runs: FLA: Devon White (1); SF: Jeff Kent 2 (2); Attendance: 57,188; Boxscore

In Game 3, the Giants looked to Wilson Álvarez to keep them alive. Opposing him would be Alex Fernandez, hoping to close out the series. The game was scoreless until the bottom of the fourth, when Jeff Kent hit a home run with one out to make it 1–0 Giants. Later, however, the Marlins would put the series away when switch-hitting Devon White hit a stunning grand slam into the left field bleachers in the top of the sixth, which was just his second home run hit while right-handed on the season. Kent would hit another home run in the bottom half, but two RBI doubles by Charles Johnson and Craig Counsell put any hopes of a Giants comeback out of reach. Robb Nen got Damon Berryhill to ground out to end the series. In response to their team being swept, Giants fans littered the field with garbage as the Marlins players celebrated. This was the final MLB playoff game at Candlestick Park, as the team moved to Pacific Bell Park after the 1999 season. Until 2016, this was the last time the Giants lost a postseason series at home. In their next six appearances in the postseason, they either lost the series on the road or won the World Series until finally losing at home in the 2016 NLDS. As of 2026, this series is the last time the Giants were swept in the postseason.

=== Composite box ===
1997 NLDS (3–0): Florida Marlins over San Francisco Giants

Team	1	2	3	4	5	6	7	8	9	R	H	E
Florida Marlins	2	0	1	2	0	5	1	2	2	15	27	4
San Francisco Giants	1	1	1	2	0	1	2	0	1	9	22	0
Total attendance: 140,638 Average attendance: 46,879

== Houston vs. Atlanta ==
The Houston Astros finally made it back to the postseason for the first time since the 1986 National League Championship Series. The Atlanta Braves were hosting their first postseason series at Turner Field. The Braves and Astros were formerly members of the National League West from 1969 to 1993.

=== Game 1 ===
September 30, 1997 1:07 pm (EDT) at Turner Field in Atlanta, Georgia 77 °F (25 °C), sunny
Team	1	2	3	4	5	6	7	8	9	R	H	E
Houston	0	0	0	0	1	0	0	0	0	1	7	1
Atlanta	1	1	0	0	0	0	0	0	X	2	2	0
WP: Greg Maddux (1–0) LP: Darryl Kile (0–1); Home runs: HOU: None; ATL: Ryan Klesko (1); Attendance: 46,467; Boxscore

Game 1 was a matchup between Darryl Kile and Greg Maddux. Kenny Lofton led off the bottom of the first with a double, the first postseason hit at Turner Field. Keith Lockhart flied to right, putting Lofton at third. Then Chipper Jones hit a sacrifice fly to left field to make it 1–0 Braves in the first. Then Ryan Klesko homered to lead off the second, a homer which would prove to be the game winner. The Astros would strike for a run in the fifth, thanks to an RBI single by Kile. Maddux and Kile dueled for seven innings. Kile allowed only two hits and Maddux pitched a complete game.

=== Game 2 ===
October 1, 1997 1:09 pm (EDT) at Turner Field in Atlanta, Georgia 75 °F (24 °C), sunny
Team	1	2	3	4	5	6	7	8	9	R	H	E
Houston	0	0	0	3	0	0	0	0	0	3	6	2
Atlanta	0	0	3	0	3	5	0	2	X	13	10	1
WP: Tom Glavine (1–0) LP: Mike Hampton (0–1); Home runs: HOU: None; ATL: Jeff Blauser (1); Attendance: 49,200; Boxscore

The Astros sent Mike Hampton to the mound against Tom Glavine. The game was quiet through the first 2 1/2 innings, but, in the bottom of the third, Jeff Blauser hit a three-run homer to put the Braves ahead. The Astros, however, would tie the game thanks to a two-run double by Brad Ausmus and an RBI single by Mike Hampton that scored Ausmus. The Astros would make a game of it, but only for the moment. With two outs in the bottom of the fifth, Hampton would surrender four consecutive walks to give the Braves the lead. Hampton would leave, but Mike Magnante gave up two more runs thanks to a two-run single by Greg Colbrunn. Next inning, Magnante allowed three singles, the last of which to Fred McGriff scoring a run. Ramón García walked Javy Lopez to load the bases before first baseman Jeff Bagwell's error on Andruw Jones's ground ball allowed two runs to score and put runners on second and third. Danny Bautista's two-run single extended the Braves' lead to 11–3. In the eighth, Lopez's two-run double off of Billy Wagner made it 13–3 Braves. Glavine pitched six innings for the win while Mike Cather and Mark Wohlers pitched three scoreless innings of relief to give the Braves a 2–0 series lead.

=== Game 3 ===
October 3, 1997 3:07 pm (CDT) at Astrodome in Houston, Texas 72 °F (22 °C), dome
Team	1	2	3	4	5	6	7	8	9	R	H	E
Atlanta	1	1	0	0	0	0	1	1	0	4	8	2
Houston	0	0	0	0	0	0	1	0	0	1	3	1
WP: John Smoltz (1–0) LP: Shane Reynolds (0–1); Home runs: ATL: Chipper Jones (1); HOU: Chuck Carr (1); Attendance: 53,688; Boxscore

Game 3 was a battle between John Smoltz and Shane Reynolds. Chipper Jones got the Braves started with a two-out homer in the top of the first. An RBI single by Jeff Blauser made it 2–0 in the second, and another RBI single, by Michael Tucker, made it 3–0 in the seventh. Although Reynolds pitched well (two runs over six innings), John Smoltz pitched brilliantly, allowing only three hits and one run, a homer by Chuck Carr, in a complete-game victory. A passed ball allowed one final insurance run to make it 4–1 Braves in the eighth. Bill Spiers grounded out in the bottom of the ninth to end the series.

=== Composite box ===
1997 NLDS (3–0): Atlanta Braves over Houston Astros

Team	1	2	3	4	5	6	7	8	9	R	H	E
Atlanta Braves	2	2	3	0	3	5	1	3	0	19	20	3
Houston Astros	0	0	0	3	1	0	1	0	0	5	16	4
Total attendance: 149,355 Average attendance: 49,785
