= 2004 American League Division Series =

Teams
Team (Wins)		Manager	Season
New York Yankees (3)		Joe Torre	101–61 (.623), GA: 3
Minnesota Twins (1)		Ron Gardenhire	92–70 (.568), GA: 9
- Dates: October 5–9
- Television: Fox (Games 1, 4); ESPN (Games 2–3)
- TV announcers: Joe Buck and Tim McCarver (Game 1); Jon Miller, Joe Morgan, and Gary Miller (Games 2–3); Josh Lewin and Steve Lyons (Game 4)
- Radio: ESPN
- Radio announcers: Dan Shulman and Dave Campbell
- Umpires: Charlie Reliford, Mark Wegner, Brian Gorman, Mike Everitt, Jerry Crawford, Paul Nauert

Teams
Team (Wins)		Manager	Season
Boston Red Sox (3)		Terry Francona	98–64 (.605), GB: 3
Anaheim Angels (0)		Mike Scioscia	92–70 (.568), GA: 1
- Dates: October 5–8
- Television: ESPN
- TV announcers: Chris Berman, Rick Sutcliffe, Tony Gwynn, and Kyle Peterson
- Radio: ESPN
- Radio announcers: John Rooney and Buck Martinez
- Umpires: Larry Young, Jerry Meals, Brian Runge, Gary Cederstrom, Ed Montague, Kerwin Danley

The 2004 American League Division Series (ALDS) consisted of two best-of-five playoff series on the American League side in Major League Baseball’s (MLB) 2004 postseason, began on Tuesday, October 5, and ended on Saturday, October 9, with the champions of the three AL divisions—along with a "wild card" team—participating in two series.

Under MLB's playoff format, no two teams from the same division were matched up in the Division Series, regardless of whether their records would normally indicate such a matchup. Home field advantage went to the team with the better regular-season record with the exception of the wild card team, which defers home field advantage regardless of record. The matchups were:

- (1) New York Yankees (AL East champions) vs. (3) Minnesota Twins (AL Central champions): Yankees won the series, 3–1.
- (2) Anaheim Angels (AL West champions) vs. (4) Boston Red Sox (Wild Card qualifier): Red Sox won the series, 3–0.

The higher seeded team in each series hosts Games 1, 2, and 5 (if necessary), and the lower seeded team hosts Games 3 and 4 (if necessary).

The Yankees and Red Sox went on to meet in the AL Championship Series (ALCS) for the second straight year. The Red Sox became the American League champion after overcoming a 3–0 series deficit, and defeated the National League champion St. Louis Cardinals in the 2004 World Series in a four-game sweep for their first World Championship since 1918.

== Matchups ==
=== New York Yankees vs. Minnesota Twins ===
New York won the series, 3–1.

Game	Date	Score	Location	Time	Attendance
1	October 5	Minnesota Twins – 2, New York Yankees – 0	Yankee Stadium (I)	2:53	55,749
2	October 6	Minnesota Twins – 6, New York Yankees – 7 (12)	Yankee Stadium (I)	4:19	56,354
3	October 8	New York Yankees – 8, Minnesota Twins – 4	Hubert H. Humphrey Metrodome	3:02	54,803
4	October 9	New York Yankees – 6, Minnesota Twins – 5 (11)	Hubert H. Humphrey Metrodome	4:16	52,498

=== Anaheim Angels vs. Boston Red Sox ===
Boston won the series, 3–0.

Game	Date	Score	Location	Time	Attendance
1	October 5	Boston Red Sox – 9, Anaheim Angels – 3	Angel Stadium of Anaheim	3:04	44,608
2	October 6	Boston Red Sox – 8, Anaheim Angels – 3	Angel Stadium of Anaheim	3:48	45,118
3	October 8	Anaheim Angels – 6, Boston Red Sox – 8 (10)	Fenway Park	4:11	35,547

== New York vs. Minnesota ==
=== Game 1 ===
October 5, 2004 8:21 pm (EDT) at Yankee Stadium (I) in Bronx, New York 52 °F (11 °C), sunny
Team	1	2	3	4	5	6	7	8	9	R	H	E
Minnesota	0	0	1	0	0	1	0	0	0	2	7	0
New York	0	0	0	0	0	0	0	0	0	0	9	0
WP: Johan Santana (1–0) LP: Mike Mussina (0–1) Sv: Joe Nathan (1); Home runs: MIN: Jacque Jones (1); NYY: None; Attendance: 55,749; Boxscore

Pitching dominated in Game 1 as Mike Mussina faced Johan Santana. The Twins got on the board first when Shannon Stewart singled home Michael Cuddyer, who singled to leadoff and moved to second on a sacrifice bunt. Then in the sixth, Jacque Jones hit a solo home run to make it 2–0. The Yankees got nine hits and numerous walks, but never capitalized on Santana, Juan Rincón, or closer Joe Nathan, hitting into five double plays (including a strikeout-caught stealing play in the second and fly ball-out at home play in the third). This was the last postseason game won by the Twins until their win over Toronto in Game 1 of the 2023 American League Wild Card Series.

=== Game 2 ===
October 6, 2004 7:10 pm (EDT) at Yankee Stadium (I) in Bronx, New York 59 °F (15 °C), clear
Team	1	2	3	4	5	6	7	8	9	10	11	12	R	H	E
Minnesota	1	2	0	0	0	0	0	2	0	0	0	1	6	12	0
New York	1	0	2	0	1	0	1	0	0	0	0	2	7	9	0
WP: Paul Quantrill (1–0) LP: Joe Nathan (0–1); Home runs: MIN: Torii Hunter (1); NYY: Derek Jeter (1), Gary Sheffield (1), Alex Rodriguez (1); Attendance: 56,354; Boxscore

Brad Radke of the Twins faced Jon Lieber of the Yankees in Game 2. In the top of the first, Justin Morneau doubled in Torii Hunter to give the Twins a 1–0 lead. In the bottom of the first, Derek Jeter's leadoff home run tied the score. A single by Michael Cuddyer with two on and sacrifice fly by Henry Blanco made it 3–1 Twins, but Gary Sheffield tied the game with a two-run homer in the bottom of the third. Alex Rodriguez gave the Yankees the lead in the bottom of the fifth with a solo home run. He added in another run in the seventh by singling home Miguel Cairo, who drew a leadoff walk and moved to second on a sacrifice bunt, to make it 5–3 Yankees. Jacque Jones reached first on a strike three wild pitch from Tom Gordon, then Torii Hunter singled to put runners on first and second in the eighth. Mariano Rivera came in but, a single by Morneau and a ground-rule double by Corey Koskie scored a run each, tying the game, but with the go-ahead run at third, Rivera retired Jason Kubel and Cristian Guzmán to end the inning. The game went into extra innings and in the top of the 12th, Torii Hunter hit the go-ahead solo home run off Tanyon Sturtze. The Twins were on the verge of putting the Yankees down two games to none, heading home, but Twins manager Ron Gardenhire left closer Joe Nathan in for a third inning of work, despite having two solid relievers still yet to be used in the game. Nathan got the first out, but then walked Cairo and Jeter on four pitches each, after which Gardenhire still chose to leave Nathan in despite his clearly having nothing left and Alex Rodriguez coming up. Rodriguez promptly hit a ground-rule double that tied the game. Then, after Sheffield was intentionally walked, Hideki Matsui hit the game-winning sacrifice fly that scored Jeter off J.C. Romero. Paul Quantrill earned a win by retiring the last hitter of the top of the 11th as the Yankees tied the series heading to Minnesota.

=== Game 3 ===
October 8, 2004 7:09 pm (CDT) at Hubert H. Humphrey Metrodome in Minneapolis, Minnesota 70 °F (21 °C), dome
Team	1	2	3	4	5	6	7	8	9	R	H	E
New York	0	3	0	0	0	4	1	0	0	8	14	1
Minnesota	1	0	0	0	0	0	0	0	3	4	12	1
WP: Kevin Brown (1–0) LP: Carlos Silva (0–1); Home runs: NYY: Bernie Williams (1), Hideki Matsui (1); MIN: Jacque Jones (2); Attendance: 54,803; Boxscore

Yankees starter Kevin Brown faced Twins hurler Carlos Silva in the crucial Game 3. The Twins grabbed the lead in the bottom of the first when Jacque Jones hit his second home run of the series, but with two outs in the second, five straight singles gave the Yankees a 3–1 lead. Then, as the night wore on, the Yanks blew the game open in the sixth. Bernie Williams hit a two-run homer after Matsui singled to lead off the inning. After a single, walk, sacrifice bunt and strikeout from J.C. Romero, Derek Jeter added a two-run single off Jesse Crain to make it 7–1 Yankees. Brown hurled six innings, while Hideki Matsui's home run in the seventh inning to make it 8–1 Yankees. The Twins, however, did not go quietly. Two consecutive hit-by-pitches to lead off the bottom of the ninth inning by Félix Heredia was followed by two singles off Tanyon Sturtze, the second of which by Michael Cuddyer scored a run. Mariano Rivera relieved Sturtze and allowed a groundout by Jose Offerman and sacrifice fly by Shannon Stewart before Jones grounded out to end the game as the Yankees' 8–4 win gave them a 2–1 series lead.

=== Game 4 ===
October 9, 2004 7:09 pm (CDT) at Hubert H. Humphrey Metrodome in Minneapolis, Minnesota 70 °F (21 °C), dome
Team	1	2	3	4	5	6	7	8	9	10	11	R	H	E
New York	0	0	1	0	0	0	0	4	0	0	1	6	11	0
Minnesota	1	0	0	1	3	0	0	0	0	0	0	5	12	1
WP: Mariano Rivera (1–0) LP: Kyle Lohse (0–1); Home runs: NYY: Rubén Sierra (1); MIN: Henry Blanco (1); Attendance: 52,498; Boxscore

Javier Vázquez of the Yankees went against Johan Santana of the Twins, who were on the board first with a sacrifice fly by Torii Hunter in the first after back-to-back singles. But the Yankees tied it in the third when Derek Jeter hit a leadoff single, moved to second on a groundout, and scored on an RBI single by Hideki Matsui. A walk and double in the fourth was followed by Corey Koskie's sacrifice fly that put the Twins back in front 2–1. Henry Blanco led the bottom of the fifth off with a home run to make it 3–1 Twins. Two two-out singles and a hit-by-pitch loaded the bases before a two-run double by Lew Ford extended the Twins' lead to 5–1. However, the Twins squandered the lead in the top of the eighth with Juan Rincón pitching in relief. Bernie Williams would single home Gary Sheffield after a single and wild pitch. With Matsui and Williams on base and one out, Rubén Sierra hit the game-tying three-run home run. Joe Nathan would come on in relief and get the next two outs. The game went into extra innings and Alex Rodriguez doubled, stole third, and scored on Kyle Lohse's wild pitch in the top of the 11th to put the Yankees up 6–5. Mariano Rivera got the win with two shutout innings as he retired the Twins 1–2–3 to end the series in the bottom of the 11th.

=== Composite box ===
2004 ALDS (3–1): New York Yankees over Minnesota Twins

Team	1	2	3	4	5	6	7	8	9	10	11	12	R	H	E
New York Yankees	1	3	3	0	1	4	2	4	0	0	1	2	21	43	1
Minnesota Twins	3	2	1	1	3	1	0	2	3	0	0	1	17	43	2
Total attendance: 219,404 Average attendance: 54,851

== Anaheim vs. Boston ==
=== Game 1 ===
October 5, 2004 1:09 pm (PDT) at Angel Stadium of Anaheim in Anaheim, California 73 °F (23 °C), sunny
Team	1	2	3	4	5	6	7	8	9	R	H	E
Boston	1	0	0	7	0	0	0	1	0	9	11	1
Anaheim	0	0	0	1	0	0	2	0	0	3	9	1
WP: Curt Schilling (1–0) LP: Jarrod Washburn (0–1); Home runs: BOS: Kevin Millar (1), Manny Ramírez (1); ANA: Troy Glaus (1), Darin Erstad (1); Attendance: 44,608; Boxscore

Game 1 pitched Curt Schilling against Jarrod Washburn. The Red Sox struck first when David Ortiz singled home Manny Ramírez, who doubled with two outs. In the fourth, the Red Sox blew the game open. After Ortiz walked to open the inning, Kevin Millar homered to make it 3–0. Then the Red Sox loaded the bases with one out. Johnny Damon would reach on an error by Chone Figgins that scored two unearned runs to make it 5–0. Scot Shields relieved Washburn and after Mark Bellhorn struck out, Manny Ramírez hit a three-run home run to make it 8–0 Red Sox. Troy Glaus' home run in the bottom of the inning put the Angels on the board. In the seventh, Darin Erstad homered off Schilling with one out. Garret Anderson reached on Schilling's throwing error before scoring on Glaus's double, but Alan Embree and Mike Timlin held them scoreless for the rest of the game while the Red Sox added run in the eighth on Doug Mientkiewicz's RBI single with two on off Ramon Ortiz.

=== Game 2 ===
October 6, 2004 7:10 pm (PDT) at Angel Stadium of Anaheim in Anaheim, California 70 °F (21 °C), clear
Team	1	2	3	4	5	6	7	8	9	R	H	E
Boston	0	1	0	0	0	2	1	0	4	8	12	0
Anaheim	0	1	0	0	2	0	0	0	0	3	7	0
WP: Pedro Martínez (1–0) LP: Francisco Rodríguez (0–1) Sv: Keith Foulke (1); Home runs: BOS: Jason Varitek (1); ANA: None; Attendance: 45,118; Boxscore

Pedro Martínez of the Red Sox faced Bartolo Colón of the Angels. A bases-loaded walk to Manny Ramirez for the Red Sox in the second put them ahead 1–0. However, the Angels would tie it in the bottom half with an RBI single by Dallas McPherson after a leadoff walk and single. The Angels would take their only lead in the series when Vladimir Guerrero, the eventual MVP, singled home Jose Molina and David Eckstein with the bases loaded. The Red Sox immediately responded when Jason Varitek hit a two-out, two-run homer to tie the game in the sixth. The Sox would take the lead on a sacrifice fly by Manny Ramírez in the seventh off Francisco Rodriguez, then padded their lead in the ninth off Brendan Donnelly. Ramirez doubled with one out and after an intentional walk, scored on Trot Nixon's single. After a two-out intentional walk loaded the bases, Orlando Cabrera cleared them with a double. Keith Foulke retired the Angels in order in the bottom of the inning as the Red Sox's 8–3 win gave them a 2–0 series lead.

=== Game 3 ===
October 8, 2004 4:10 pm (EDT) at Fenway Park in Boston, Massachusetts 74 °F (23 °C), cloudy
Team	1	2	3	4	5	6	7	8	9	10	R	H	E
Anaheim	0	0	0	1	0	0	5	0	0	0	6	8	2
Boston	0	0	2	3	1	0	0	0	0	2	8	12	0
WP: Derek Lowe (1–0) LP: Francisco Rodríguez (0–2); Home runs: ANA: Troy Glaus (2), Vladimir Guerrero (1); BOS: David Ortiz (1); Attendance: 35,547; Boxscore

Kelvim Escobar of the Angels and Bronson Arroyo of the Red Sox faced off in the clincher. The Red Sox once again struck first with runners on second and third when Trot Nixon's single and Kevin Millar's groundout made it 2–0 in the third. The Angels cut the lead in half when Troy Glaus hit a home run in the fourth. In the bottom of the inning, a single, error and walk loaded the bases before Manny Ramirez's sacrifice fly made it 3–1 Red Sox. Scot Shields relieved Escobar and allowed an RBI double to David Ortiz. After an intentional walk loaded the bases, another Angel error allowed Mark Bellhorn to score to make it 5–1 Red Sox. Ramirez's RBI single with two on next inning increased the lead to 6–1. It appeared as if the Angels were down and out, but they loaded the bases in the top of the seventh thanks to two walks and a single. After Chone Figgins struck out, Darin Erstad walked to force in a run that made it 6–2. Mike Timlin then threw to Vladimir Guerrero, who hit a grand slam to right that evened the score at 6–6 and stunned the Fenway crowd. The game went to extra innings and, in the bottom of the tenth, Johnny Damon led off with a single. After Pokey Reese forced him and Ramirez struck out, Jarrod Washburn relieved Francisco Rodríguez and David Ortiz hit the series-winning two-run home run over the Green Monster to send the Red Sox to the ALCS for the second straight year.

=== Composite box ===
2004 ALDS (3–0): Boston Red Sox over Anaheim Angels

Team	1	2	3	4	5	6	7	8	9	10	R	H	E
Boston Red Sox	1	1	2	10	1	2	1	1	4	2	25	35	1
Anaheim Angels	0	1	0	2	2	0	7	0	0	0	12	24	3
Total attendance: 125,273 Average attendance: 41,758
