= Brian Runge =

American baseball umpire (born 1970)

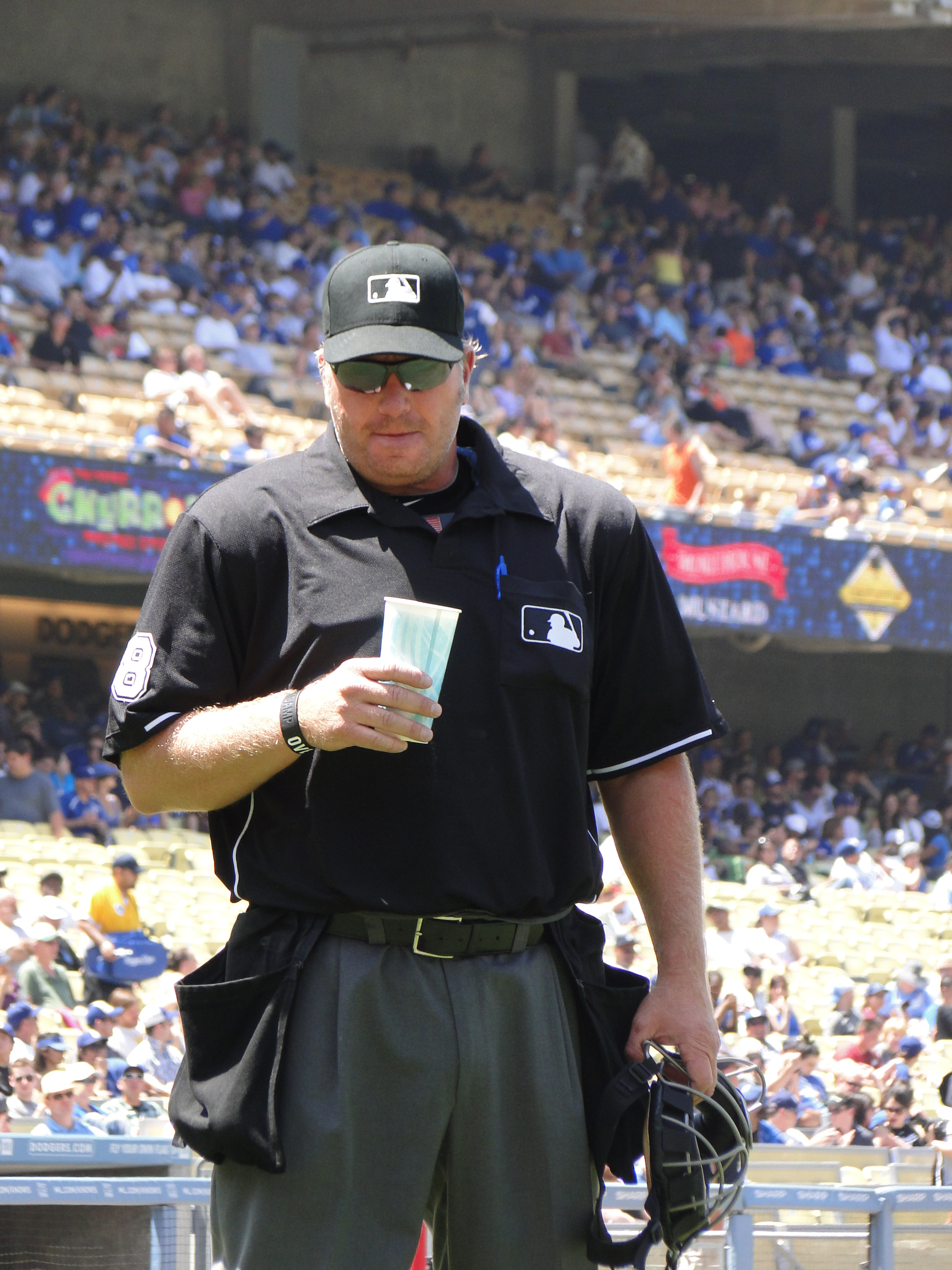
- Runge at Dodger Stadium in 2011
- Umpire
- Born: January 5, 1970 (age 56); San Diego, California, U.S.

MLB debut
- April 23, 1999

Last MLB appearance
- August 30, 2012

Career highlights and awards
- Special assignments: Division Series (2004, 2007, 2008); All-Star Games (2012); Home plate umpire for Philip Humber's perfect game (April 21, 2012); First third-generation MLB umpire

Brian Edward Runge (born January 5, 1970) is an American former umpire in Major League Baseball who worked in the National League in 1999 and throughout both major leagues from 2000 to 2012; he wore uniform number 18, and previously 71.

== Umpiring career ==
Runge worked three Division Series (2004, 2007, 2008) as well as the 2012 MLB All-Star Game. His father, Paul (NL, 1973–97), and grandfather, Ed (American League, 1954–70), also were major league umpires, which makes the Runges the first three-generation umpiring family in major league history.

=== Absences ===
Runge went on a hiatus from umpiring from the middle of July 2009 until September 20, 2009, for an undisclosed reason. He returned to the field on September 21, 2009, in Milwaukee to work home plate in a game between the Brewers and the Chicago Cubs.

In a July 28, 2010, game between the Chicago White Sox and Seattle Mariners, Runge exited prior to the start of the third inning, after taking a foul tip off his mask during a Paul Konerko at-bat against Jason Vargas in the first inning. After over a month of not umpiring due to this injury, Runge returned to the field on September 2, 2010.

Runge was on an extended hiatus from umpiring, from August 30, 2012, to July 2, 2013. He missed the last month of the 2012 season because of a knee injury. Although he did umpire 2013 MLB Spring Training games, he did not appear in the regular season. The cause of this extended absence was unknown until it was reported on July 2, 2013, that Runge had been fired for multiple failed drug tests.

=== Controversies ===
In September 2007, Runge was part of an incident involving then Padres outfielder Milton Bradley and first base umpire Mike Winters. Winters had apparently told Runge that Bradley "flipped his bat in [his] direction" after being called out on strikes earlier in the game. Runge denied that Winters had told him this, but when Bradley came to the plate in the 8th inning, Runge did ask Bradley about the bat flip. After reaching first base, Bradley raised the issue with Winters. Bradley claimed that Winters told him he had thrown his bat in Runge's direction and Bradley reacted incredulously to this. Shortly afterward, the argument got ugly as Winters reportedly shouted profanity at Bradley. When he attempted to approach the umpire, Bradley was restrained by his manager, Bud Black, and Bradley sustained a torn ACL in the process. He was also ejected from the game by Winters, who was given a suspension through the rest of the regular season.

On June 24, 2008, Runge was involved in an altercation while working home plate during a New York Mets/Seattle Mariners game at Shea Stadium. After Carlos Beltrán of the Mets questioned a called strike, Runge walked in front of the plate to dust it off, saying some words to Beltran in the process. When Mets manager Jerry Manuel came out to argue, Runge appeared to bump Manuel in the chest, before ejecting both Manuel and Beltran. As a result of the incident, Manuel and Beltran were fined, while Runge was suspended for one game.

On September 26, 2009, Runge called Ichiro Suzuki of the Seattle Mariners out on strikes. Suzuki drew a line in the dirt as a means of telling Runge the third strike was actually a ball. Runge ejected Suzuki from the game. It was the only time in his career Suzuki was ejected from a game.

=== Notable games ===
On June 28, 2007, Runge was at third base when Toronto Blue Jay Frank Thomas hit his 500th career home run off Minnesota Twins pitcher Carlos Silva. Later in the game, Thomas was ejected by plate umpire Mark Wegner for arguing balls and strikes, with Toronto manager John Gibbons also getting thrown out.

On Wednesday, September 3, 2008, Runge was the third-base umpire when Alex Rodriguez hit his 549th home run that bounced off a catwalk behind the left field foul pole at Tropicana Field against the Tampa Bay Rays. The opposing manager objected the ball was foul, and for the first time in MLB history, instant replay (a process officially introduced a few days earlier) was used to review the play and uphold the umpires' ruling.

On July 10, 2009, Runge was behind the plate for San Francisco Giants pitcher, Jonathan Sánchez's no-hitter. Runge made a dramatic called third strike to end the game. His grandfather, Ed, also was home plate umpire in 1965 for Dave Morehead's no hitter, and his father Paul was third-base umpire for Charlie Lea's 1981 no-hitter.

Runge served as home plate umpire for White Sox pitcher, Philip Humber's perfect game on April 21, 2012, at Safeco Field, and the combined no-hitter of Seattle Mariners pitcher Kevin Millwood and five relievers on June 8, 2012, also at Safeco Field, becoming the 10th Major League umpire to call balls and strikes for multiple no-hitters in the same season. He was the third-base umpire for the perfect game thrown by San Francisco Giants pitcher, Matt Cain, on June 13, 2012, at AT&T Park.

Runge was a member of the umpiring crew for the 2012 MLB All-Star Game on July 10.

=== Termination ===
On June 9, 2013, a rumor began to circulate that Runge would be removed from the MLB umpiring staff and be replaced by Triple-A fill-in umpire Chris Conroy. Less than one week later, Runge was released from Major League Baseball, reportedly due to undisclosed violations of the MLB Drug Policy.

== See also ==
- List of Major League Baseball umpires (disambiguation)
