= Steve Rippley =

American baseball umpire (born 1954)

- Born: Thomas Steven Rippley; May 2, 1954 (age 72); St. Petersburg, Florida, U.S.
- Occupation: Umpire
- Years active: 1983–2003
- Employer(s): National League, Major League Baseball

Thomas Steven Rippley (born May 2, 1954) is an American former professional baseball umpire. He worked in the National League from 1983 to 1999, and throughout both major leagues from 2000 to 2003. Rippley wore uniform number 27 through his NL career, but changed to number 3 when the umpiring staffs were merged in 2000.

Rippley umpired 2,514 regular season major league games in his 21-year career. He umpired in four division series (1996, 1997, 2001, and 2002), three League Championship series (1992, 1998, and 2000), three World Series (1996, 1999, and 2001 (crew chief)), and the 1990 All-Star Game.

== Controversy ==
On May 27, 1984, Rippley (in his rookie season) called a long fly ball hit by Chicago Cubs third baseman Ron Cey against the Cincinnati Reds as a home run, which immediately drew protests from manager Vern Rapp, pitcher Mario Soto (who bumped Rippley during the argument) and several other Reds players. Rippley discussed the play with crew chief Bob Engel and umpires Paul Runge and Randy Marsh and the call was overturned to a foul ball, which then brought Cubs manager Jim Frey out to argue, and was ejected. Later, after further consultation, the umpires also ejected Soto for bumping Rippley during the initial argument, and Soto charged out of the dugout to confront the umpires, but was intercepted by Cubs coach Don Zimmer, which resulted in a bench-clearing brawl. Both teams played the game under protest and the Reds won, 4–3.

== See also ==
- List of Major League Baseball umpires (disambiguation)
