= Dana DeMuth =

American baseball umpire (born 1956)

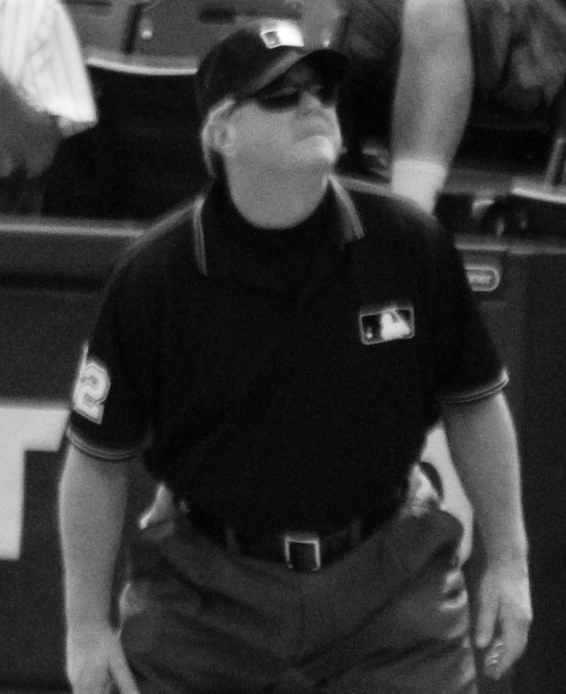
- DeMuth in 2008
- Born: May 30, 1956 (age 70); Fremont, Ohio, U.S.

debut
- June 3, 1983

Last appearance
- July 12, 2019

Career highlights and awards
- Special Assignments: All-Star Game (1990, 2001, 2009); Division Series (1996, 1997, 1999, 2001, 2008, 2009, 2010, 2012, 2013, 2015, 2017); League Championship Series (1991, 1995, 2000, 2002, 2007); World Series (1993, 1998, 2001, 2009, 2013); World Baseball Classic (2009)

Dana Andrew DeMuth (born May 30, 1956) is an American former umpire in Major League Baseball.

== Umpiring career ==
DeMuth advanced through the minor leagues to the Triple-A Pacific Coast League before joining the National League staff full-time June 3, 1983. DeMuth continued umpiring in the National League until the umpiring staffs of the American and National Leagues merged in 2000. He was a crew chief from 1999 to 2019. DeMuth wore the uniform number 32 throughout his career.

His postseason assignments included 11 Division Series (1996, 1997, 1999, 2001, 2008, 2009, 2010, 2012, 2013, 2015, and 2017), 5 League Championship Series (1991, 1995, 2000, 2002 and 2007), and 5 World Series (1993, 1998, 2001, 2009 and 2013).

He also umpired in the All-Star Game in 1990, 2001, and 2009, working behind the plate for the second and third contests, and worked the 2009 World Baseball Classic.

Following the 2019 season, DeMuth announced his retirement. He umpired 4,283 regular season games and 101 postseason games.

=== Notable games ===
DeMuth was the home plate umpire for Game 6 of the 1993 World Series; a game memorable for Joe Carter's series-ending home run in the bottom of the ninth inning.

DeMuth was the third base umpire for the game between the San Francisco Giants and the San Diego Padres on August 4, 2007. In the top of the second inning at San Diego, Barry Bonds of the Giants hit his 755th career home run off Clay Hensley, tying Hank Aaron for first all-time.

DeMuth was the home plate umpire for the game between the San Francisco Giants and the New York Yankees on September 20, 2013. In the bottom of the seventh inning, Alex Rodriguez of the Yankees hit his 24th career grand slam off George Kontos, passing Lou Gehrig for first all-time.

DeMuth was the home plate umpire for a no-hitter pitched by Jake Arrieta between the Chicago Cubs and the Cincinnati Reds on April 21, 2016. This was Arrieta's 2nd career no hitter. Chicago won the game, 16–0.

== See also ==
- List of Major League Baseball umpires (disambiguation)
