= Bill Hohn =

American baseball umpire (born 1955)

- Born: June 29, 1955 (age 69); Butler, Pennsylvania, U.S.
- Occupation: Former MLB umpire
- Height: 6 ft 0 in (183 cm)

William John Hohn (born June 29, 1955) is an American former professional baseball umpire. He worked in Major League Baseball during 1987–1999 (in the National League) and 2002–2010. His uniform number was 29.

== Umpiring career ==
Prior to joining MLB, Hohn served in numerous other professional baseball leagues during 1977–1988. He umpired four MLB games during 1987, 32 in 1988, then 96 in 1989; during his 21 seasons as an MLB umpire, he worked a total of 2195 regular season games, 10 postseason games, and one All-Star Game. He umpired in the 1994 Major League Baseball All-Star Game, and the National League Division Series in 1996, 1998, and 2005. He issued a total of 89 ejections, leading MLB umpires in ejections twice, with eight in 2008 and nine in 2009.

Hohn was the home plate umpire for Hideo Nomo's no-hitter on September 17, 1996. Hohn missed the entire 2011 season owing to back and neck issues, and his retirement was announced on April 5, 2012. His spot on the MLB roster was filled by Todd Tichenor.

=== Controversies ===
On July 5, 1992, while umpiring a game between the Atlanta Braves and the Chicago Cubs, Hohn approached the Braves dugout while arguing with Atlanta player Terry Pendleton, with the dispute leading to the ejection of Braves manager Bobby Cox. After a fan made a gesture with his hand toward Hohn, the umpire called for security to have the fan removed from the stadium. However, the fan would only be required to move 29 rows back.

On June 21, 2009, Hohn ejected Braves players Eric O'Flaherty and Chipper Jones, and manager Cox, for arguing balls and strikes. O'Flaherty, on an 0–2, pitch seemingly struck out J. D. Drew in Boston. Hohn called the pitch a ball (visual evidence showed otherwise) and then ejected the three Braves following Drew's single off the Green Monster. A run would score on the play to make the score 5–4 in favor of Boston.

On July 29, 2009, Hohn again roused the ire of the Braves after he exchanged a fist-bump with Florida Marlins catcher John Baker at the conclusion of a Braves–Marlins game. Hohn had ejected Braves manager Cox and catcher Brian McCann from the game. Terry Pendleton, then Braves hitting coach, called the fist-bump "shocking", while Chipper Jones said, "I've never seen it before in my 16 years." Hohn declined to comment on the situation, other than to state that the league had reviewed it.

On May 31, 2010, Hohn ejected Houston Astros pitcher Roy Oswalt from a game against the Washington Nationals, although Oswalt told Hohn that he was not talking to him. MLB executive Bob Watson stated that Oswalt would not receive more punishment, while Hohn would be addressed "in a very stern way." It was the first time Oswalt had been ejected since August 2004, when he was thrown out by Hohn after a hit batsman.

== See also ==
- List of Major League Baseball umpires (disambiguation)
