= Terry Tata =

American baseball umpire (born 1940)

- Born: April 24, 1940 (age 85); Waterbury, Connecticut, U.S.
- Occupation: Former MLB umpire
- Years active: 1973-1999 Special assignments: All-Star Games (1978, 1988, 1999); Division Series (1981, 1995, 1996, 1997); League Championship Series (1976, 1980, 1983, 1985, 1989, 1993, 1998); World Series (1979, 1987, 1991, 1996)
- Height: 5 ft 10 in (178 cm)

Terry Anthony Tata (born April 24, 1940) is an American former Major League Baseball (MLB) umpire. His MLB career began when the National League purchased his contract from the Triple-A International League on March 21, 1973. It ended in 1999.

== Career ==
During his career, Tata officiated four World Series, seven National League Championship Series and three All-Star games. He also officiated in five no-hitters, including being the home plate umpire for two: Phil Niekro's on August 5, 1973 and Tom Seaver's on June 16, 1978. Tata wore uniform number 19 for most of his career.

Tata appeared on the television program What's My Line? on June 11, 1961, where he was presented as being the youngest umpire in "organized baseball." He was 21 years old at the time and stated that he worked in the Northern League which incorporated, he said on the program, "Minnesota, the Dakotas, Canada, and Wisconsin." The panelists were able to discern his occupation.

== Personal life ==
Tata is married to his wife Janice, and they live in Cheshire, Connecticut.

On June 22, 1993, Tata was drugged and robbed in his room in Burlingame, California. After working second base in that evening’s game between the San Diego Padres and the San Francisco Giants at Candlestick Park, he invited a woman up to his room for a drink. She slipped a tranquilizer into his glass and made off with a Rolex watch, a gold bracelet, two World Series rings, and $500 in cash.

== See also ==
- List of Major League Baseball umpires (disambiguation)
