= 2008 National League Division Series =

American baseball games

Teams
Team (Wins)		Manager	Season
Los Angeles Dodgers (3)		Joe Torre	84–78 (.519), GA: 2
Chicago Cubs (0)		Lou Piniella	97–64 (.602), GA: 7 1/2
- Dates: October 1–4
- Television: TBS
- TV announcers: Dick Stockton, Ron Darling, Tony Gwynn, and Tom Verducci
- Radio: ESPN
- Radio announcers: Jon Miller and Rick Sutcliffe
- Umpires: Dale Scott, Paul Emmel, Jeff Nelson, Tom Hallion, Gerry Davis, Jim Reynolds

Teams
Team (Wins)		Manager	Season
Philadelphia Phillies (3)		Charlie Manuel	92–70 (.568), GA: 3
Milwaukee Brewers (1)		Dale Sveum	90–72 (.556), GB: 7 1/2
- Dates: October 1–5
- Television: TBS
- TV announcers: Brian Anderson, Joe Simpson, John Smoltz, and David Aldridge
- Radio: ESPN
- Radio announcers: Michael Kay and Steve Phillips
- Umpires: Dana DeMuth, Mark Wegner, Brian Runge, Fieldin Culbreth, Jim Joyce, Paul Nauert

The 2008 National League Division Series (NLDS) consisted of two best-of-five playoff series on the National League side in Major League Baseball’s 2008 postseason, began on Wednesday, October 1 and ended on Sunday, October 5, with the champions of the three NL divisions and one wild card team played in the two series. TBS televised all the games in the United States.

Under MLB's playoff format, no two teams from the same division were matched up in the Division Series, regardless of whether their records would normally indicate such a matchup. Home field advantage went to the team with the better regular-season record with the exception of the wild card team, which defers home field advantage regardless of record. The matchups were:

- (1) Chicago Cubs (NL Central champions) vs. (3) Los Angeles Dodgers (NL West champions): Dodgers won the series, 3–0.
- (2) Philadelphia Phillies (NL East champions) vs. (4) Milwaukee Brewers (Wild Card qualifier): Phillies won the series, 3–1.

The underdog Dodgers swept the Cubs to advance to the NLCS, while the Phillies defeated the Brewers three games to one. The series marked the first postseason series victory for the Dodgers since winning the 1988 World Series, and the first such victory for the Phillies since the 1993 NLCS.

The Phillies defeated the Dodgers for the National League pennant, and went on to win the 2008 World Series, defeating the American League champion Tampa Bay Rays in five games.

== Matchups ==
=== Chicago Cubs vs. Los Angeles Dodgers ===
Los Angeles won the series, 3–0.

Game	Date	Score	Location	Time	Attendance
1	October 1	Los Angeles Dodgers – 7, Chicago Cubs – 2	Wrigley Field	3:10	42,099
2	October 2	Los Angeles Dodgers – 10, Chicago Cubs – 3	Wrigley Field	3:10	42,136
3	October 4	Chicago Cubs – 1, Los Angeles Dodgers – 3	Dodger Stadium	3:03	56,000

=== Philadelphia Phillies vs. Milwaukee Brewers ===
Philadelphia won the series, 3–1.

Game	Date	Score	Location	Time	Attendance
1	October 1	Milwaukee Brewers – 1, Philadelphia Phillies – 3	Citizens Bank Park	2:39	45,929
2	October 2	Milwaukee Brewers – 2, Philadelphia Phillies – 5	Citizens Bank Park	3:00	46,208
3	October 4	Philadelphia Phillies – 1, Milwaukee Brewers – 4	Miller Park	3:31	43,992
4	October 5	Philadelphia Phillies – 6, Milwaukee Brewers – 2	Miller Park	2:53	43,934

== Chicago vs. Los Angeles ==
=== Game 1 ===
October 1, 2008 5:38 pm (CDT) at Wrigley Field in Chicago, Illinois 56 °F (13 °C), mostly cloudy
Team	1	2	3	4	5	6	7	8	9	R	H	E
Los Angeles	0	0	0	0	4	0	1	1	1	7	8	1
Chicago	0	2	0	0	0	0	0	0	0	2	9	1
WP: Derek Lowe (1–0) LP: Ryan Dempster (0–1); Home runs: LAD: James Loney (1), Manny Ramírez (1), Russell Martin (1); CHC: Mark DeRosa (1); Attendance: 42,099; Boxscore

The Dodgers swiped Game 1 from the Cubs at Wrigley Field. Mark DeRosa gave the Cubs an early lead in the second inning with an opposite-field two-run home run, but Derek Lowe settled in afterward by going six innings while three relievers held the Cubs scoreless over the last three innings. Ryan Dempster pitched four shutout innings, allowing two hits and four walks, but in the fifth, allowed three walks to load the bases for the Dodgers before James Loney's grand slam put them ahead 4–2. Manny Ramírez's home run in the seventh off Sean Marshall made it 5–2 Dodgers. Next inning, Blake DeWitt hit a leadoff double off Jeff Samardzija and scored on Casey Blake's single. In the ninth, Russell Martin's lead off home run off Jason Marquis made it 7–2 Dodgers. Greg Maddux pitched a scoreless bottom half as the Dodgers took a 1–0 series lead.

=== Game 2 ===
October 2, 2008 8:37 pm (CDT) at Wrigley Field in Chicago, Illinois 59 °F (15 °C), mostly cloudy
Team	1	2	3	4	5	6	7	8	9	R	H	E
Los Angeles	0	5	0	0	1	0	1	2	1	10	12	0
Chicago	0	0	0	0	0	0	1	0	2	3	8	4
WP: Chad Billingsley (1–0) LP: Carlos Zambrano (0–1); Home runs: LAD: Manny Ramírez (2); CHC: None; Attendance: 42,136; Boxscore

The Dodgers struck first with a five-run second off Carlos Zambrano. After leadoff singles by Andre Ethier and James Loney, two one-out errors allowed one run to score and load the bases with no outs. After a strikeout, Rafael Furcal's RBI single made it 2–0 Dodgers, then Russell Martin cleared the bases with a double. All five runs scored were unearned. Manny Ramírez' second home run in the series in the fifth, his record-stretching 26th postseason dinger, extended the Dodgers' lead to 6–0. In the seventh, Ramirez walked off Zambrano, who was relieved by Neal Cotts. After a walk and forceout, Matt Kemp's RBI double made it 7–0 Dodgers. Chad Billingsley pitched 6 2/3 innings, allowing one run in the seventh on back-to-back two-out doubles by Mark DeRosa and Jim Edmonds. In the eighth, RBI singles by Furcal and Ramirez off Carlos Marmol made it 9–1 Dodgers. Next inning, Juan Pierre reached second on a two-out error off Kerry Wood, the Cubs' fourth of the game and one by each starting infielder, before Casey Blake's RBI single made it 10–1 Dodgers. In the bottom of the inning, Takashi Saito allowed a leadoff double and single before DeRosa's two-run double made it 10–3 Dodgers. Jonathan Broxton in relief walked Felix Pie before retiring the next three batters to end the game and give the Dodgers a 2–0 series lead.

=== Game 3 ===
October 4, 2008 7:07 pm (PDT) at Dodger Stadium in Los Angeles, California 64 °F (18 °C), cloudy
Team	1	2	3	4	5	6	7	8	9	R	H	E
Chicago	0	0	0	0	0	0	0	1	0	1	8	1
Los Angeles	2	0	0	0	1	0	0	0	X	3	6	0
WP: Hiroki Kuroda (1–0) LP: Rich Harden (0–1) Sv: Jonathan Broxton (1); Attendance: 56,000; Boxscore

Before a sellout crowd in Dodger Stadium, Russell Martin doubled, then took third on a base hit by Manny Ramírez in the bottom of the first despite a risky baserunning move that almost killed the momentum. Replays showed Martin was out, but the third base umpire ruled it safe. James Loney then stroked a double to right field off Rich Harden to score them both. Martin's RBI double after a walk in the fifth extended the Dodgers' lead to 3–0. It proved to be all the offense the Dodgers needed, as Hiroki Kuroda was locked in, hurling shutout ball into the sixth; the first 11 outs he recorded were all ground ball outs before he struck out Rich Harden to end the fourth. Cory Wade gave up a run on a pinch-hit Daryle Ward single in the top of the eighth after a leadoff double by Derrek Lee, but Jonathan Broxton took over and earned his first career postseason save by striking out Alfonso Soriano to complete the sweep. The Cubs suffered their ninth consecutive post-season loss and second consecutive sweep.

=== Composite box ===
2008 NLDS (3–0): Los Angeles Dodgers over Chicago Cubs

Team	1	2	3	4	5	6	7	8	9	R	H	E
Los Angeles Dodgers	2	5	0	0	6	0	2	3	2	20	26	1
Chicago Cubs	0	2	0	0	0	0	1	1	2	6	25	6
Total attendance: 140,235 Average attendance: 46,745

== Philadelphia vs. Milwaukee ==
=== Game 1 ===
October 1, 2008 3:07 pm (EDT) at Citizens Bank Park in Philadelphia, Pennsylvania 70 °F (21 °C), showers
Team	1	2	3	4	5	6	7	8	9	R	H	E
Milwaukee	0	0	0	0	0	0	0	0	1	1	4	1
Philadelphia	0	0	3	0	0	0	0	0	X	3	4	1
WP: Cole Hamels (1–0) LP: Yovani Gallardo (0–1) Sv: Brad Lidge (1); Attendance: 45,929; Boxscore

Phillies ace Cole Hamels pitched eight shutout innings of two-hit ball while striking out nine to give the Phillies their first playoff victory since Game 5 of the 1993 World Series. Yovani Gallardo gave up three runs, none earned, while walking five. All three runs came in the third on Chase Utley's two-run double after a single and error by Rickie Weeks, then three consecutive walks forced in another run. Brad Lidge got his first save of the postseason, allowing one run (on Ryan Braun's double after a Ray Durham single) and runners to advance to second and third with one out, before striking out Prince Fielder and Corey Hart to end the game.

=== Game 2 ===
October 2, 2008 6:08 pm (EDT) at Citizens Bank Park in Philadelphia, Pennsylvania 60 °F (16 °C), partly cloudy
Team	1	2	3	4	5	6	7	8	9	R	H	E
Milwaukee	1	0	0	0	0	0	1	0	0	2	3	0
Philadelphia	0	5	0	0	0	0	0	0	X	5	9	1
WP: Brett Myers (1–0) LP: CC Sabathia (0–1) Sv: Brad Lidge (2); Home runs: MIL: None; PHI: Shane Victorino (1); Attendance: 46,208; Boxscore

A crowd of 46,208, the largest in the five-year history of Citizens Bank Park, came out to watch Brett Myers pitch seven innings giving up two hits and two runs while striking out four and walking three to lead the Phillies to victory, giving them their first 2–0 playoff series lead since the 1980 World Series against the Kansas City Royals. The Brewers in the first loaded the bases with one out on a double and two walks. A walk to J.J. Hardy forced in a run, but Corey Hart hit into an inning-ending double play. CC Sabathia pitched 3 2/3 innings on three days' rest giving up all five runs in the second inning. Back-to-back one-out doubles by Jayson Werth and Pedro Feliz tied the game. Myers had the key AB for the Phillies as he stretched the AB from a 1–2 count into a walk. It unnerved Sabathia and, after another walk loaded the bases, Shane Victorino's grand slam gave the Phillies the lead. It was the first postseason grand slam in Phillies history. The Brewers scored one more run in the seventh when Hardy hit a leadoff double, moved to third on a fly out and scored on Craig Counsell's groundout. Ryan Braun's eighth inning single off Ryan Madson was the Brewers' only other hit of the game. Brad Lidge retired the side in order in the ninth inning for his second save in as many games in the playoffs.

=== Game 3 ===
October 4, 2008 5:38 pm (CDT) at Miller Park in Milwaukee, Wisconsin 65 °F (18 °C), roof closed
Team	1	2	3	4	5	6	7	8	9	R	H	E
Philadelphia	0	0	0	0	0	1	0	0	0	1	9	0
Milwaukee	2	0	0	0	1	0	1	0	X	4	11	0
WP: Dave Bush (1–0) LP: Jamie Moyer (0–1) Sv: Salomón Torres (1); Attendance: 43,992; Boxscore

With their backs against the proverbial wall, the Brewers sent out Dave Bush to quiet the Phillies in the first ever postseason game at Miller Park. His offense picked him up early, however, taking some pressure off with two runs in the bottom of the first when two walks and a wild pitch by Jamie Moyer put runners on second and third with one out, then a sacrifice fly by Prince Fielder, scoring Mike Cameron, and J.J. Hardy's RBI single gave the Brewers a 2–0 lead. Their struggling bullpen held the door closed after Bush's departure, giving up no runs in 3 2/3 innings. The Brewers added to their lead in the fifth when Cameron was hit by a pitch by Clay Condrey, moved to third on a single and scored on Ryan Braun's sacrifice fly. The Phillies scored their only run of the game when Jayson Werth hit a leadoff triple off Bush and scored on Ryan Howard's groundout off Mitch Stetter. After failing to score with the bases loaded and one out in the sixth, the Brewers increased their lead to 4–1 on Jason Kendall's RBI single in the seventh off Scott Eyre with two on. In the ninth, Salomón Torres gave up three consecutive singles to load the bases with nobody out, but induced a double play ball from Pedro Feliz that should have scored a run, but did not because Shane Victorino did not slide into second base, and interference was called. Torres then retired Carlos Ruiz to end the game, which made the Phillies the first team in MLB playoff history to load the bases with no outs in the ninth and not score, and the Brew Crew won their first postseason game since Game 5 of the 1982 World Series.

=== Game 4 ===
October 5, 2008 12:07 pm (CDT) at Miller Park in Milwaukee, Wisconsin 66 °F (19 °C), roof closed
Team	1	2	3	4	5	6	7	8	9	R	H	E
Philadelphia	1	0	4	0	0	0	0	1	0	6	10	0
Milwaukee	0	0	0	0	0	0	1	1	0	2	8	0
WP: Joe Blanton (1–0) LP: Jeff Suppan (0–1); Home runs: PHI: Jimmy Rollins (1), Pat Burrell 2 (2), Jayson Werth (1); MIL: Prince Fielder (1); Attendance: 43,934; Boxscore

Brewers fans got thundersticks as they entered Miller Park for Game 4, but the real thunder was supplied by the Phillies' bats, winning their first postseason series since the 1993 NLCS with Jimmy Rollins leading off the game on the sixth pitch off Jeff Suppan with a solo home run, then in the third inning with Pat Burrell (three-run) and Jayson Werth (solo) hitting back-to-back home runs. Joe Blanton struck out seven batters in six innings while giving up five hits but only one run, which was Prince Fielder's solo home run in the seventh. Burrell hit his second home run of the game in the eighth off Guillermo Mota. The Brewers got a run in the bottom half when Mike Cameron singled with one out off Ryan Madson, moved to second on defensive indifference, and scored on Ryan Braun's single, but Brad Lidge again pitched the final inning to close the game, although it was not a save situation as the Phillies advanced to the NLCS with a 6–2 win.

Burrell became only the second Phillies hitter in their history to hit two home runs in a playoff game, the other being Lenny Dykstra. He is also only the fifth National League player to hit two home runs in a series clinching game, joining Steve Garvey (1974 NLCS), Johnny Bench (1976 World Series), Fred McGriff (1995 NLDS), and Carlos Beltrán (2004 NLDS).

=== Composite box ===
2008 NLDS (3–1): Philadelphia Phillies over Milwaukee Brewers

Team	1	2	3	4	5	6	7	8	9	R	H	E
Philadelphia Phillies	1	5	7	0	0	1	0	1	0	15	32	2
Milwaukee Brewers	3	0	0	0	1	0	3	1	1	9	26	1
Total attendance: 180,063 Average attendance: 45,016

== See also ==
- 2008 American League Division Series
