= Division Series =

Major League Baseball postseason series

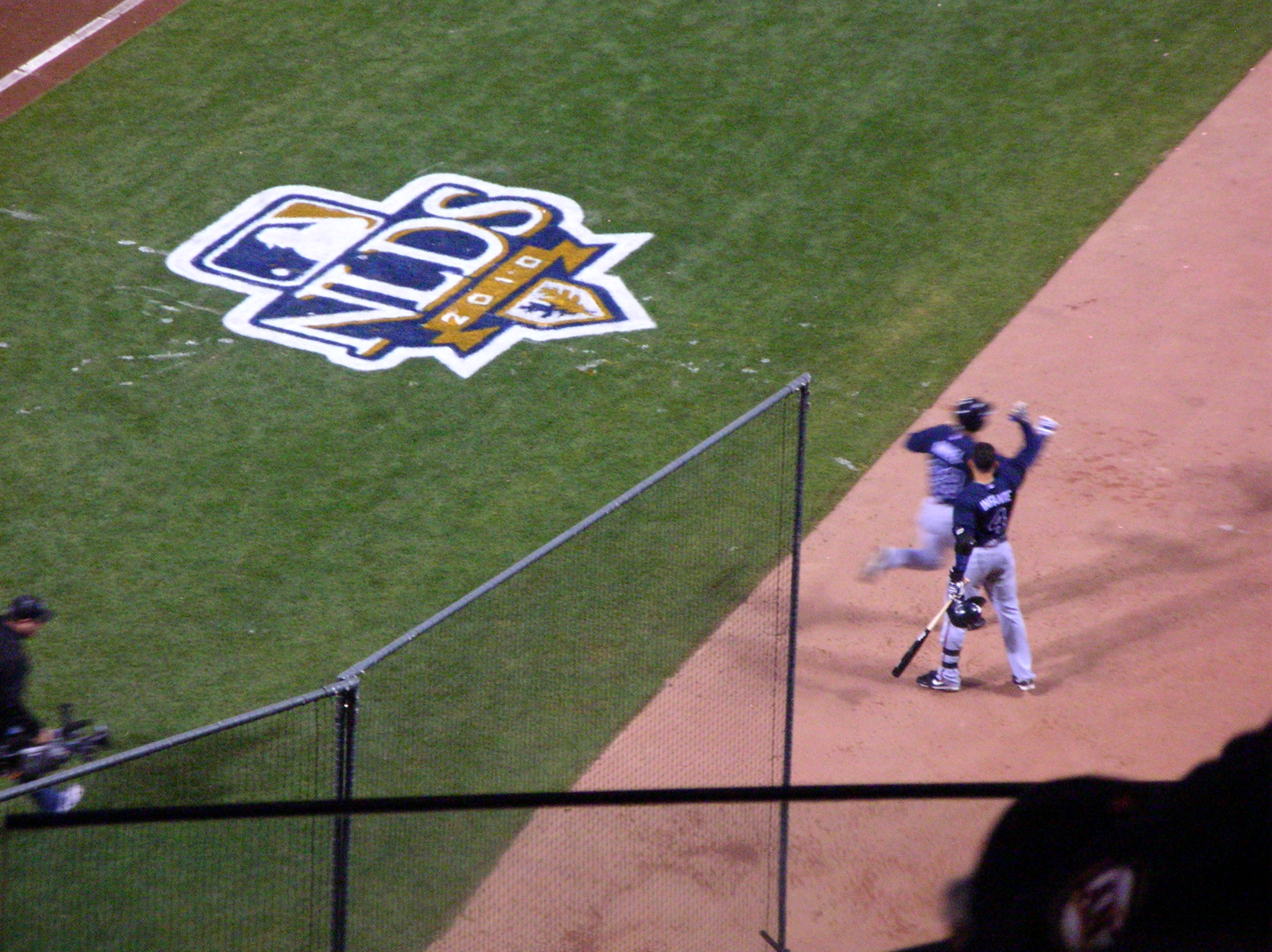
Atlanta Braves outfielder Rick Ankiel after hitting a home run during Game 2 of the National League Division Series against the San Francisco Giants at AT&T Park, giving the Braves the winning run 5-4 in extra innings.

The Division Series (DS) is the quarterfinal round of postseason play in Major League Baseball, featuring the American League Division Series (ALDS) and the National League Division Series (NLDS). Under the current format, the top-two division winners in each league play best-of-five series against the two winners of the Wild Card Series from each league. The winners of the Division Series then advance to the League Championship Series for their respective league.

== History ==
=== 1981 season ===
The first use of the term "Division Series" dates to 1981, when, due to a mid-season players' strike, the season was divided into two halves. To attempt to balance the two halves of the season, the postseason was temporarily expanded to include a Division Series, with the winners of the first and second half from each division (East and West at the time) playing one another in a best-of-five series to decide which team would represent that division in the League Championship Series (this format being common in Minor League Baseball).

The temporary format did not come without flaws, however. One flaw was that, because the two halves of the season were independent of one another, the winner of the first half had no real incentive to try to win the second half as well. Even if one team finished first in their division in both halves, they would not receive a bye for the round, and would instead have to play the Division Series against the team that finished in second place for the second half.

In addition, a team that finished with the best overall record in the division over the course of both halves of the season could still miss the playoffs if they failed to place first in their division at the end of either half of the season. This was the case for the Cincinnati Reds, who posted a 66–42 overall record, the best over both halves in the National League West division, yet they missed the playoffs because they were in second place at the end of both the first and second half. The St. Louis Cardinals also suffered this same result, as they finished with a 59–43 record over both halves of the season, but were in second place in the National League East division at the end of each half.

The Division Series did not return after the 1981 season, as the league reverted back to its normal postseason format at the time.

=== 1995–2011 ===
In 1993, owners approved the reintroduction of the Division Series, this time on a permanent basis. A cause for the expansion was the fact that three of the four series in the one-off 1981 Division Series went to a decisive game five. Originally, the new format called for the first-place teams in the two divisions per league to play the second-place teams in the opposite divisions of that league. For example, the first-place team in the American League East would play the second-place team in the American League West, and vice versa.

In 1994, both the National League and the American League realigned, with the number of divisions in both increasing from two to three (adding a Central Division, with fewer teams in each division). The plan for the new format was altered to allow the three first-place teams from each league's divisions to reach the postseason, along with one wild card team from each league (the best second-place finisher in each league). The new format was intended to debut that season, but it was delayed when the 1994 postseason was canceled due to a players' strike, and it instead debuted with the 1995 postseason.

Originally, the East, Central, and West Division champions rotated home-site priority, with two division winners getting an extra home game, and the third one not having the extra game along with the wild card team, who never had it. The 2–3 format was used in which the disadvantaged team hosted the first two games, and the team with the advantage hosted the remaining game(s). This made it impossible for the disadvantaged team to clinch the series at home. A similar format had been used for the League Championship Series from 1969 to 1984. It also allowed the disadvantaged teams the unusual luxury of starting a series at home, and a guarantee that they play two games at home, whereas the advantaged team may play only one game at home if the series ends in a three-game sweep.

In 1998, the method for awarding home-field advantage was changed. The two division champions with the best regular-season records were given home-field advantage, forcing the worst division winner to play an extra road game. Also, the format changed to a 2–2–1 layout, with the team having home-field advantage hosting games 1, 2, and (if necessary) 5. In both the AL and NL, the three division champions were automatically given the top three seeds, seeded 1–3 based on record, and the wild-card was given the 4th seed regardless of record. In both the AL and the NL, the #1 seed played the #4 seed and the #2 seed played the #3 seed, unless the #1 and #4 seed were in the same division. Because teams from the same division could not play each other in the first round, if the normal matchups would cause this, then the #1 seed played the #3 seed, and the #2 seed played the #4 seed. In all cases, the top two seeds had home-field advantage.

From 2007 to 2010, the #1 seed of the league that won the All-Star Game was given another advantage. In addition to earning home-field advantage throughout the entire playoffs, they were allowed to choose their schedule for the series. They could either choose to have an extra day off (usually between games 1 and 2) during the series and start a day early, or start a day late, with one less off day (only having travel days off, between games 2 and 3, and if necessary 4 and 5). The American League's best record received this option from 2007–2009 and the National League's best record received it in 2010.

=== 2012–2019, 2021 ===
A revised playoff system was utilized beginning with the 2012 season, which added a second wild-card team for each league. The two wild card teams in each league played a one-game playoff to advance. The winner of this game advanced to play the #1 seed in the league in the Division Series, regardless of whether the two teams were in the same division. Because the format was added well after the regular season schedule was announced, the 2012 Division Series used a 2–3 format. From 2013 to 2021, the Division Series used the 2–2–1 format previously used.

=== 2020 ===
The 2020 postseason was modified from its usual format due to the temporary expansion of the playoffs for the 60-game regular season. After a best-of-three, 8-team Wild Card Series, the winners of the 1 vs. 8 matchup faced the winners of the #4 vs. #5 matchup while the #2 vs. #7 faced the #3 vs. #6. Each of the four matchups were played in consecutive days at neutral sites, with the usual 2–2–1 structure used to determine the designated home teams. When every team from the two Central Divisions were eliminated in the Wild Card Series, it meant that all four Division Series matchups would feature teams from the same division playing each other (i.e. East playing East and West playing West), the first occasion of this happening since 1981.

=== 2022–present ===
With the expansion of the postseason to six teams per league since the 2022 season, only the two best division winners earn byes to the Division Series. The Wild Card Series was reinstated as a best-of-three series featuring the third-best division winner and three wild card teams, with the two winners of that round advancing to the Division Series. In this round, the #1 seed faces the #4 vs. #5 winner, and the #2 seed plays the #3 vs. #6 winner; the bracket does not re-seed.

== Criticism of scheduling ==
There has been some criticism on how Major League Baseball schedules Division Series games. Teams with large national fan followings like the New York Yankees are almost always scheduled to play in prime time at 8 p.m. ET/5 p.m. PT to generate the highest television ratings. As a result, West Coast teams generally have to play on the road in the afternoon, when many of their fans are unable to watch the game because they are at work or school. Conversely, when games on the West Coast are played at 10 p.m. ET/7 p.m. PT, many fans on the East Coast are unable to watch a game in its entirety, due to work or school the next day and games ending around 1 a.m. ET/10 p.m. PT, while most West Coast fans are able to watch the entire game as it will not end as late on the West Coast.

However, in 1995, (as aforementioned, the 1994 series was not played due to the strike), the Division and League Championship Series was aired by the league's television operation, The Baseball Network, a joint syndication package between ABC and NBC. In order to increase viewership, all games were played in prime time at consistent times, and each affiliate of the network carrying the series could only air one of the games each night, determined by the station's area. While this prevented the issue of afternoon games (and did, as planned, increase viewership), the plan drew ire from critics for not allowing viewers to choose the games they want to watch during the postseason.

== Results ==
=== American League Division Series ===
Key
†	Wild card

Year	Winning team	Manager	Games	Losing team	Manager
1981	New York Yankees	Bob Lemon	3–2	Milwaukee Brewers	Buck Rodgers
1981	Oakland Athletics	Billy Martin	3–0	Kansas City Royals	Dick Howser
1994	No series due to a players' strike.				
1995	Cleveland Indians	Mike Hargrove	3–0	Boston Red Sox	Kevin Kennedy
1995	Seattle Mariners	Lou Piniella	3–2	New York Yankees^{†}	Buck Showalter
1996	New York Yankees	Joe Torre	3–1	Texas Rangers	Johnny Oates
1996	Baltimore Orioles^{†}	Davey Johnson	3–1	Cleveland Indians	Mike Hargrove
1997	Baltimore Orioles	Davey Johnson	3–1	Seattle Mariners	Lou Piniella
1997	Cleveland Indians	Mike Hargrove	3–2	New York Yankees^{†}	Joe Torre
1998	New York Yankees	Joe Torre	3–0	Texas Rangers	Johnny Oates
1998	Cleveland Indians	Mike Hargrove	3–1	Boston Red Sox^{†}	Jimy Williams
1999	New York Yankees	Joe Torre	3–0	Texas Rangers	Johnny Oates
1999	Boston Red Sox^{†}	Jimy Williams	3–2	Cleveland Indians	Mike Hargrove
2000	Seattle Mariners^{†}	Lou Piniella	3–0	Chicago White Sox	Jerry Manuel
2000	New York Yankees	Joe Torre	3–2	Oakland Athletics	Art Howe
2001	New York Yankees	Joe Torre	3–2	Oakland Athletics^{†}	Art Howe
2001	Seattle Mariners	Lou Piniella	3–2	Cleveland Indians	Charlie Manuel
2002	Minnesota Twins	Ron Gardenhire	3–2	Oakland Athletics	Art Howe
2002	Anaheim Angels^{†}	Mike Scioscia	3–1	New York Yankees	Joe Torre
2003	New York Yankees	Joe Torre	3–1	Minnesota Twins	Ron Gardenhire
2003	Boston Red Sox^{†}	Grady Little	3–2	Oakland Athletics	Ken Macha
2004	New York Yankees	Joe Torre	3–1	Minnesota Twins	Ron Gardenhire
2004	Boston Red Sox^{†}	Terry Francona	3–0	Anaheim Angels	Mike Scioscia
2005	Chicago White Sox	Ozzie Guillén	3–0	Boston Red Sox^{†}	Terry Francona
2005	Los Angeles Angels of Anaheim	Mike Scioscia	3–2	New York Yankees	Joe Torre
2006	Detroit Tigers^{†}	Jim Leyland	3–1	New York Yankees	Joe Torre
2006	Oakland Athletics	Ken Macha	3–0	Minnesota Twins	Ron Gardenhire
2007	Boston Red Sox	Terry Francona	3–0	Los Angeles Angels of Anaheim	Mike Scioscia
2007	Cleveland Indians	Eric Wedge	3–1	New York Yankees^{†}	Joe Torre
2008	Boston Red Sox^{†}	Terry Francona	3–1	Los Angeles Angels of Anaheim	Mike Scioscia
2008	Tampa Bay Rays	Joe Maddon	3–1	Chicago White Sox	Ozzie Guillén
2009	New York Yankees	Joe Girardi	3–0	Minnesota Twins	Ron Gardenhire
2009	Los Angeles Angels of Anaheim	Mike Scioscia	3–0	Boston Red Sox^{†}	Terry Francona
2010	Texas Rangers	Ron Washington	3–2	Tampa Bay Rays	Joe Maddon
2010	New York Yankees^{†}	Joe Girardi	3–0	Minnesota Twins	Ron Gardenhire
2011	Texas Rangers	Ron Washington	3–1	Tampa Bay Rays^{†}	Joe Maddon
2011	Detroit Tigers	Jim Leyland	3–2	New York Yankees	Joe Girardi
2012	Detroit Tigers	Jim Leyland	3–2	Oakland Athletics	Bob Melvin
2012	New York Yankees	Joe Girardi	3–2	Baltimore Orioles^{†}	Buck Showalter
2013	Detroit Tigers	Jim Leyland	3–2	Oakland Athletics	Bob Melvin
2013	Boston Red Sox	John Farrell	3–1	Tampa Bay Rays^{†}	Joe Maddon
2014	Baltimore Orioles	Buck Showalter	3–0	Detroit Tigers	Brad Ausmus
2014	Kansas City Royals^{†}	Ned Yost	3–0	Los Angeles Angels of Anaheim	Mike Scioscia
2015	Toronto Blue Jays	John Gibbons	3–2	Texas Rangers	Jeff Banister
2015	Kansas City Royals	Ned Yost	3–2	Houston Astros^{†}	A. J. Hinch
2016	Cleveland Indians	Terry Francona	3–0	Boston Red Sox	John Farrell
2016	Toronto Blue Jays^{†}	John Gibbons	3–0	Texas Rangers	Jeff Banister
2017	Houston Astros	A. J. Hinch	3–1	Boston Red Sox	John Farrell
2017	New York Yankees^{†}	Joe Girardi	3–2	Cleveland Indians	Terry Francona
2018	Houston Astros	A. J. Hinch	3–0	Cleveland Indians	Terry Francona
2018	Boston Red Sox	Alex Cora	3–1	New York Yankees^{†}	Aaron Boone
2019	New York Yankees	Aaron Boone	3–0	Minnesota Twins	Rocco Baldelli
2019	Houston Astros	A. J. Hinch	3–2	Tampa Bay Rays^{†}	Kevin Cash
2020	Tampa Bay Rays	Kevin Cash	3–2	New York Yankees	Aaron Boone
2020	Houston Astros	Dusty Baker	3–1	Oakland Athletics	Bob Melvin
2021	Boston Red Sox^{†}	Alex Cora	3–1	Tampa Bay Rays	Kevin Cash
2021	Houston Astros	Dusty Baker	3–1	Chicago White Sox	Tony La Russa
2022	Houston Astros	Dusty Baker	3–0	Seattle Mariners^{†}	Scott Servais
2022	New York Yankees	Aaron Boone	3–2	Cleveland Guardians	Terry Francona
2023	Texas Rangers^{†}	Bruce Bochy	3–0	Baltimore Orioles	Brandon Hyde
2023	Houston Astros	Dusty Baker	3–1	Minnesota Twins	Rocco Baldelli
2024	New York Yankees	Aaron Boone	3–1	Kansas City Royals^{†}	Matt Quatraro
2024	Cleveland Guardians	Stephen Vogt	3–2	Detroit Tigers^{†}	A. J. Hinch
2025	Toronto Blue Jays	John Schneider	3–1	New York Yankees^{†}	Aaron Boone
2025	Seattle Mariners	Dan Wilson	3–2	Detroit Tigers^{†}	A. J. Hinch
2026	Tampa Bay Rays	Kevin Cash	3–0	New York Yankees^{†}	Aaron Boone
2026	Cleveland Guardians	Stephen Vogt	3–2	Chicago White Sox^{†}	Will Venable

==== Notable streaks ====
- The Houston Astros advanced out of the ALDS in seven consecutive seasons (2017–2023), reaching the ALCS each year in that span.

==== Appearances by team ====
Apps	Team	Wins	Losses	Win %	Most recent win	Most recent appearance	Games won	Games lost	Game win %
26	New York Yankees	15	11	.577	2024	2026	59	47	.557
14	Boston Red Sox	8	6	.571	2021	2021	26	26	.500
13	Cleveland Guardians	7	6	.538	2026	2026	30	26	.536
9	Athletics	2	7	.222	2006	2020	19	21	.475
8	Houston Astros	7	1	.875	2023	2023	23	9	.719
8	Texas Rangers	3	5	.375	2023	2023	12	18	.400
8	Tampa Bay Rays	3	5	.375	2026	2026	16	18	.471
8	Minnesota Twins	1	7	.125	2002	2023	6	23	.207
7	Los Angeles Angels	3	4	.429	2009	2014	10	15	.400
7	Detroit Tigers	4	2	.667	2013	2025	16	16	.500
6	Seattle Mariners	4	2	.667	2025	2025	13	12	.520
5	Baltimore Orioles	3	2	.600	2014	2023	11	8	.579
5	Chicago White Sox	1	4	.200	2005	2026	7	12	.368
4	Kansas City Royals	2	2	.500	2015	2024	7	8	.467
3	Toronto Blue Jays	3	0	1.000	2025	2025	7	2	.778
1	Milwaukee Brewers (Note: The Milwaukee Brewers moved to the National League in 1998.)	0	1	.000	Never	1981	2	3	.400

==== Years of appearance ====
In the sortable table below, teams are ordered first by number of wins, then by number of appearances, and finally by year of first appearance. In the "Season(s)" column, bold years indicate winning appearances.

Apps	Team	Wins	Losses	Win %	Season(s)
26	New York Yankees	15	11	.577	1981, 1995, 1996, 1997, 1998, 1999, 2000, 2001, 2002, 2003, 2004, 2005, 2006, 2007, 2009, 2010, 2011, 2012, 2017, 2018, 2019, 2020, 2022, 2024, 2025, 2026
14	Boston Red Sox	8	6	.571	1995, 1998, 1999, 2003, 2004, 2005, 2007, 2008, 2009, 2013, 2016, 2017, 2018, 2021
13	Cleveland Guardians	7	6	.538	1995, 1996, 1997, 1998, 1999, 2001, 2007, 2016, 2017, 2018, 2022, 2024, 2026
8	Houston Astros	7	1	.875	2015, 2017, 2018, 2019, 2020, 2021, 2022, 2023
7	Detroit Tigers	4	3	.571	2006, 2011, 2012, 2013, 2014, 2024, 2025
6	Seattle Mariners	4	2	.667	1995, 1997, 2000, 2001, 2022, 2025
8	Texas Rangers	3	5	.375	1996, 1998, 1999, 2010, 2011, 2015, 2016, 2023
8	Tampa Bay Rays	3	5	.375	2008, 2010, 2011, 2013, 2019, 2020, 2021, 2026
7	Los Angeles Angels	3	4	.429	2002, 2004, 2005, 2007, 2008, 2009, 2014
5	Baltimore Orioles	3	2	.600	1996, 1997, 2012, 2014, 2023
3	Toronto Blue Jays	3	0	1.000	2015, 2016, 2025
9	Athletics	2	7	.222	1981, 2000, 2001, 2002, 2003, 2006, 2012, 2013, 2020
4	Kansas City Royals	2	2	.500	1981, 2014, 2015, 2024
8	Minnesota Twins	1	7	.125	2002, 2003, 2004, 2006, 2009, 2010, 2019, 2023
5	Chicago White Sox	1	4	.200	2000, 2005, 2008, 2021, 2026
1	Milwaukee Brewers	0	1	.000	1981

==== Frequent matchups ====
Count	Matchup	Record	Years
5	New York Yankees vs. Minnesota Twins	Yankees, 5–0	2003, 2004, 2009, 2010, 2019
4	Boston Red Sox vs. Los Angeles Angels	Red Sox, 3–1	2004, 2007, 2008, 2009
4	Cleveland Guardians vs. Boston Red Sox	Indians/Guardians, 3–1	1995, 1998, 1999, 2016
4	Cleveland Guardians vs. New York Yankees	Tied, 2–2	1997, 2007, 2017, 2022
3	Texas Rangers vs. New York Yankees	Yankees, 3–0	1996, 1998, 1999
2	New York Yankees vs. Athletics	Yankees, 2–0	2000, 2001
2	New York Yankees vs. Los Angeles Angels	Angels, 2–0	2002, 2005
2	Texas Rangers vs. Tampa Bay Rays	Rangers, 2–0	2010, 2011
2	Athletics vs. Minnesota Twins	Tied, 1–1	2002, 2006
2	Detroit Tigers vs. New York Yankees	Tigers, 2–0	2006, 2011
2	Detroit Tigers vs. Athletics	Tigers, 2–0	2012, 2013
2	Texas Rangers vs. Toronto Blue Jays	Blue Jays, 2–0	2015, 2016
2	Boston Red Sox vs. Tampa Bay Rays	Red Sox, 2–0	2013, 2021
2	New York Yankees vs. Tampa Bay Rays	Rays, 2–0	2020, 2026

=== National League Division Series ===
Key
†	Wild card

Year	Winning team	Manager	Games	Losing team	Manager
1981	Montreal Expos	Jim Fanning	3–2	Philadelphia Phillies	Dallas Green
1981	Los Angeles Dodgers	Tommy Lasorda	3–2	Houston Astros	Bill Virdon
1994	No Series due to a players' strike.				
1995	Atlanta Braves	Bobby Cox	3–1	Colorado Rockies^{†}	Don Baylor
1995	Cincinnati Reds	Davey Johnson	3–0	Los Angeles Dodgers	Tommy Lasorda
1996	Atlanta Braves	Bobby Cox	3–0	Los Angeles Dodgers^{†}	Bill Russell
1996	St. Louis Cardinals	Tony La Russa	3–0	San Diego Padres	Bruce Bochy
1997	Atlanta Braves	Bobby Cox	3–0	Houston Astros	Larry Dierker
1997	Florida Marlins^{†}	Jim Leyland	3–0	San Francisco Giants	Dusty Baker
1998	Atlanta Braves	Bobby Cox	3–0	Chicago Cubs^{†}	Jim Riggleman
1998	San Diego Padres	Bruce Bochy	3–1	Houston Astros	Larry Dierker
1999	Atlanta Braves	Bobby Cox	3–1	Houston Astros	Larry Dierker
1999	New York Mets^{†}	Bobby Valentine	3–1	Arizona Diamondbacks	Buck Showalter
2000	St. Louis Cardinals	Tony La Russa	3–0	Atlanta Braves	Bobby Cox
2000	New York Mets^{†}	Bobby Valentine	3–1	San Francisco Giants	Dusty Baker
2001	Atlanta Braves	Bobby Cox	3–0	Houston Astros	Larry Dierker
2001	Arizona Diamondbacks	Bob Brenly	3–2	St. Louis Cardinals^{†}	Tony La Russa
2002	St. Louis Cardinals	Tony La Russa	3–0	Arizona Diamondbacks	Bob Brenly
2002	San Francisco Giants^{†}	Dusty Baker	3–2	Atlanta Braves	Bobby Cox
2003	Chicago Cubs	Dusty Baker	3–2	Atlanta Braves	Bobby Cox
2003	Florida Marlins^{†}	Jack McKeon	3–1	San Francisco Giants	Felipe Alou
2004	St. Louis Cardinals	Tony La Russa	3–1	Los Angeles Dodgers	Jim Tracy
2004	Houston Astros^{†}	Phil Garner	3–2	Atlanta Braves	Bobby Cox
2005	St. Louis Cardinals	Tony La Russa	3–0	San Diego Padres	Bruce Bochy
2005	Houston Astros^{†}	Phil Garner	3–1	Atlanta Braves	Bobby Cox
2006	New York Mets	Willie Randolph	3–0	Los Angeles Dodgers^{†}	Jim Tracy
2006	St. Louis Cardinals	Tony La Russa	3–1	San Diego Padres	Bruce Bochy
2007	Colorado Rockies^{†}	Clint Hurdle	3–0	Philadelphia Phillies	Charlie Manuel
2007	Arizona Diamondbacks	Bob Melvin	3–0	Chicago Cubs	Lou Piniella
2008	Los Angeles Dodgers	Joe Torre	3–0	Chicago Cubs	Lou Piniella
2008	Philadelphia Phillies	Charlie Manuel	3–1	Milwaukee Brewers^{†}	Dale Sveum
2009	Los Angeles Dodgers	Joe Torre	3–0	St. Louis Cardinals	Tony La Russa
2009	Philadelphia Phillies	Charlie Manuel	3–1	Colorado Rockies^{†}	Jim Tracy
2010	Philadelphia Phillies	Charlie Manuel	3–0	Cincinnati Reds	Dusty Baker
2010	San Francisco Giants	Bruce Bochy	3–1	Atlanta Braves^{†}	Bobby Cox
2011	St. Louis Cardinals^{†}	Tony La Russa	3–2	Philadelphia Phillies	Charlie Manuel
2011	Milwaukee Brewers	Ron Roenicke	3–2	Arizona Diamondbacks	Kirk Gibson
2012	San Francisco Giants	Bruce Bochy	3–2	Cincinnati Reds	Dusty Baker
2012	St. Louis Cardinals^{†}	Mike Matheny	3–2	Washington Nationals	Davey Johnson
2013	St. Louis Cardinals	Mike Matheny	3–2	Pittsburgh Pirates^{†}	Clint Hurdle
2013	Los Angeles Dodgers	Don Mattingly	3–1	Atlanta Braves	Fredi González
2014	St. Louis Cardinals	Mike Matheny	3–1	Los Angeles Dodgers	Don Mattingly
2014	San Francisco Giants^{†}	Bruce Bochy	3–1	Washington Nationals	Matt Williams
2015	New York Mets	Terry Collins	3–2	Los Angeles Dodgers	Don Mattingly
2015	Chicago Cubs^{†}	Joe Maddon	3–1	St. Louis Cardinals	Mike Matheny
2016	Los Angeles Dodgers	Dave Roberts	3–2	Washington Nationals	Dusty Baker
2016	Chicago Cubs	Joe Maddon	3–1	San Francisco Giants^{†}	Bruce Bochy
2017	Chicago Cubs	Joe Maddon	3–2	Washington Nationals	Dusty Baker
2017	Los Angeles Dodgers	Dave Roberts	3–0	Arizona Diamondbacks^{†}	Torey Lovullo
2018	Milwaukee Brewers	Craig Counsell	3–0	Colorado Rockies ^{†}	Bud Black
2018	Los Angeles Dodgers	Dave Roberts	3–1	Atlanta Braves	Brian Snitker
2019	Washington Nationals ^{†}	Dave Martinez	3–2	Los Angeles Dodgers	Dave Roberts
2019	St. Louis Cardinals	Mike Shildt	3–2	Atlanta Braves	Brian Snitker
2020	Atlanta Braves	Brian Snitker	3–0	Miami Marlins	Don Mattingly
2020	Los Angeles Dodgers	Dave Roberts	3–0	San Diego Padres	Jayce Tingler
2021	Atlanta Braves	Brian Snitker	3–1	Milwaukee Brewers	Craig Counsell
2021	Los Angeles Dodgers^{†}	Dave Roberts	3–2	San Francisco Giants	Gabe Kapler
2022	San Diego Padres^{†}	Bob Melvin	3–1	Los Angeles Dodgers	Dave Roberts
2022	Philadelphia Phillies^{†}	Rob Thomson	3–1	Atlanta Braves	Brian Snitker
2023	Philadelphia Phillies^{†}	Rob Thomson	3–1	Atlanta Braves	Brian Snitker
2023	Arizona Diamondbacks^{†}	Torey Lovullo	3–0	Los Angeles Dodgers	Dave Roberts
2024	Los Angeles Dodgers	Dave Roberts	3–2	San Diego Padres^{†}	Mike Shildt
2024	New York Mets^{†}	Carlos Mendoza	3–1	Philadelphia Phillies	Rob Thomson
2025	Milwaukee Brewers	Pat Murphy	3-2	Chicago Cubs^{†}	Craig Counsell
2025	Los Angeles Dodgers	Dave Roberts	3–1	Philadelphia Phillies	Rob Thomson
2026	Milwaukee Brewers	Pat Murphy	3–1	San Diego Padres^{†}	Craig Stammen
2026	Los Angeles Dodgers	Dave Roberts	3–1	Atlanta Braves	Walt Weiss

==== Appearances by team ====
Apps	Team	Wins	Losses	Win %	Most recent win	Most recent appearance	Games won	Games lost	Game win %
21	Los Angeles Dodgers	12	9	.571	2026	2026	43	39	.524
20	Atlanta Braves	8	12	.400	2021	2026	39	39	.500
14	St. Louis Cardinals	11	3	.786	2019	2019	36	20	.643
10	Philadelphia Phillies	5	5	.500	2023	2025	21	19	.525
9	San Francisco Giants	4	5	.444	2014	2021	17	21	.447
8	Chicago Cubs	4	4	.500	2017	2025	12	16	.429
8	San Diego Padres	2	6	.250	2022	2026	10	20	.333
7	Houston Astros (Note: The Houston Astros moved to the American League in 2013.)	2	5	.286	2005	2005	10	18	.357
7	Arizona Diamondbacks	3	4	.429	2023	2023	12	14	.462
6	Milwaukee Brewers	4	2	.667	2026	2026	14	11	.560
6	Washington Nationals	2	4	.333	2019	2019	13	16	.448
5	New York Mets	5	0	1.000	2024	2024	15	5	.750
4	Colorado Rockies	1	3	.250	2007	2018	5	9	.357
3	Cincinnati Reds	1	2	.333	1995	2012	5	6	.455
3	Miami Marlins	2	1	.667	2003	2020	6	4	.600
1	Pittsburgh Pirates	0	1	.000	Never	2013	2	3	.400

==== Years of appearance ====
In the sortable table below, teams are ordered first by number of wins, then by number of appearances, and finally by year of first appearance. In the "Season(s)" column, bold years indicate winning appearances.

Apps	Team	Wins	Losses	Win %	Season(s)
21	Los Angeles Dodgers	12	9	.571	1981, 1995, 1996, 2004, 2006, 2008, 2009, 2013, 2014, 2015, 2016, 2017, 2018, 2019, 2020, 2021, 2022, 2023, 2024, 2025, 2026
14	St. Louis Cardinals	11	3	.786	1996, 2000, 2001, 2002, 2004, 2005, 2006, 2009, 2011, 2012, 2013, 2014, 2015, 2019
20	Atlanta Braves	8	12	.400	1995, 1996, 1997, 1998, 1999, 2000, 2001, 2002, 2003, 2004, 2005, 2010, 2013, 2018, 2019, 2020, 2021, 2022, 2023, 2026
10	Philadelphia Phillies	5	5	.500	1981, 2007, 2008, 2009, 2010, 2011, 2022, 2023, 2024, 2025
5	New York Mets	5	0	1.000	1999, 2000, 2006, 2015, 2024
9	San Francisco Giants	4	5	.444	1997, 2000, 2002, 2003, 2010, 2012, 2014, 2016, 2021
8	Chicago Cubs	4	4	.500	1998, 2003, 2007, 2008, 2015, 2016, 2017, 2025
6	Milwaukee Brewers	4	2	.667	2008, 2011, 2018, 2021, 2025, 2026
7	Arizona Diamondbacks	3	4	.429	1999, 2001, 2002, 2007, 2011, 2017, 2023
8	San Diego Padres	2	6	.250	1996, 1998, 2005, 2006, 2020, 2022, 2024, 2026
7	Houston Astros	2	5	.286	1981, 1997, 1998, 1999, 2001, 2004, 2005
6	Washington Nationals	2	4	.333	1981, 2012, 2014, 2016, 2017, 2019
3	Miami Marlins	2	1	.667	1997, 2003, 2020
4	Colorado Rockies	1	3	.250	1995, 2007, 2009, 2018
3	Cincinnati Reds	1	2	.333	1995, 2010, 2012
1	Pittsburgh Pirates	0	1	.000	2013

==== Frequent matchups ====
Count	Matchup	Record	Years
5	Atlanta Braves vs. Houston Astros	Braves, 3–2	1997, 1999, 2001, 2004, 2005
4	Los Angeles Dodgers vs. Atlanta Braves	Dodgers, 3–1	1996, 2013, 2018, 2026
3	San Diego Padres vs. St. Louis Cardinals	Cardinals, 3–0	1996, 2005, 2006
3	St. Louis Cardinals vs. Los Angeles Dodgers	Cardinals, 2–1	2004, 2009, 2014
3	Los Angeles Dodgers vs. San Diego Padres	Dodgers, 2–1	2020, 2022, 2024
2	St. Louis Cardinals vs. Arizona Diamondbacks	Tied, 1–1	2001, 2002
2	Florida Marlins vs. San Francisco Giants	Marlins, 2–0	1997, 2003
2	Chicago Cubs vs. Atlanta Braves	Tied, 1–1	1998, 2003
2	Philadelphia Phillies vs. Colorado Rockies	Tied, 1–1	2007, 2009
2	San Francisco Giants vs. Atlanta Braves	Giants, 2–0	2002, 2010
2	New York Mets vs. Los Angeles Dodgers	Mets, 2–0	2006, 2015
2	St. Louis Cardinals vs. Atlanta Braves	Cardinals, 2–0	2000, 2019
2	Los Angeles Dodgers vs. Washington Nationals	Tied, 1–1	2016, 2019
2	Los Angeles Dodgers vs. Arizona Diamondbacks	Tied, 1–1	2017, 2023
2	Atlanta Braves vs. Philadelphia Phillies	Phillies, 2–0	2022, 2023

== See also ==
- MLB postseason
- MLB division winners
- Wild Card Series
- League Championship Series
