= Randy Marsh (umpire) =

American baseball umpire (born 1949)

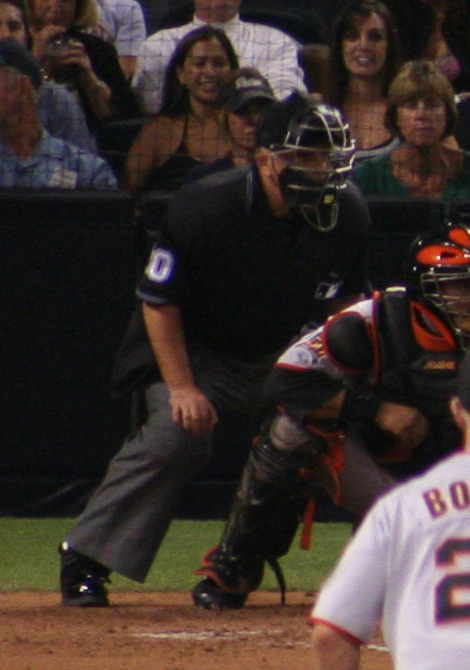
- Marsh in 2008
- Born: April 8, 1949 (age 77); Covington, Kentucky, U.S.
- Occupations: Former MLB umpire Umpire supervisor
- Years active: 1981–2009
- Height: 6 ft 0 in (1.83 m)

Randall Gilbert Marsh (born April 8, 1949) is an American former umpire in Major League Baseball who worked in the National League from 1981 to 1999 and throughout both major leagues from 2000 to 2009. Marsh wore the uniform number 30.

== Major League career ==
Marsh umpired in the World Series in 1990, 1997, 1999, 2003, and 2006, serving as crew chief for the last three Series, and in the All-Star Game in 1985, 1988, 1996, and 2006, calling balls and strikes for the 1996 game. He is the tenth umpire in history to serve as crew chief for three World Series.

Marsh also officiated in nine League Championship Series (1989, 1992, 1995, 2000, 2002, 2004, 2005, 2007, 2009) and in five Division Series (1998, 1999, 2001, 2003, 2006). He had been a crew chief from the 1998 season until his retirement following the 2009 season.

Marsh was the crew chief of Crew P for 2009, which included Mike Winters, Alfonso Márquez, and Lance Barksdale. Marsh was known for a comparatively small yet highly consistent strike zone, meaning he was among the most popular umpires for pitchers as well as hitters.

Marsh retired from umpiring following the 2009 season. As of 2018, he is the Director of Umpiring for Major League Baseball.

=== Ejections ===
On June 9, 1999, during a game between the New York Mets and Toronto Blue Jays at Shea Stadium, Marsh ejected Mets manager Bobby Valentine for arguing a catcher's balk on a pitchout. Valentine returned to the dugout later in the game (against league rules) wearing a fake mustache, sunglasses and a clubhouse jacket. Major League Baseball suspended Valentine for two games and fined him $5,000 for the incident, which has since become a popular part of his legacy.

Marsh gained minor attention once more when, during a game between the Colorado Rockies and Chicago Cubs on August 7, 2001, he ordered former Chicago Bears defensive lineman Steve McMichael ejected from Wrigley Field after he criticized crew member and former MLB umpire Angel Hernandez over the PA system when he took a turn as the guest singer for Take Me Out to the Ball Game. It was originally thought that Hernandez had ordered the ejection, but it was later revealed that it was actually Marsh.

== Awards and accolades ==
In 2015, Marsh was inducted into The Kentucky Athletic Hall of Fame.

== Personal life ==
A native of Covington, Kentucky, Marsh is a graduate of Covington Holmes High School and the University of Kentucky.

In May 2008, Marsh underwent open-heart surgery. He returned to the field in August.

== See also ==
- List of Major League Baseball umpires (disambiguation)
