= Ed Rapuano =

American baseball umpire (born 1957)

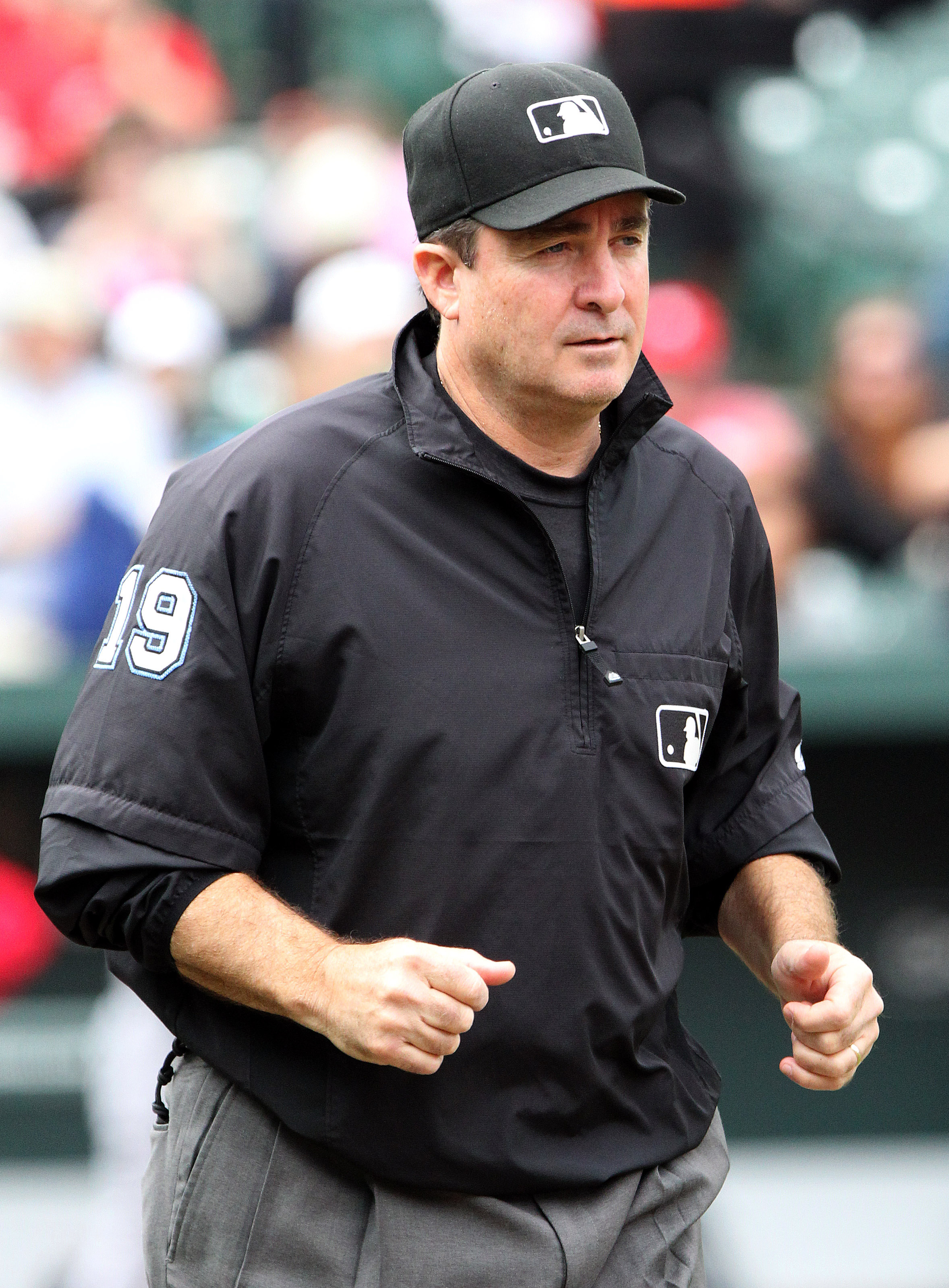
- Rapuano in 2011
- Born: September 30, 1957 (age 68); New Haven, Connecticut, U.S.
- Occupation(s): Former MLB umpire Umpire supervisor
- Years active: 1990–2012
- Height: 5 ft 10 in (1.78 m)

Edward Stephen Rapuano Jr. (born September 30, 1957) is an American umpire supervisor in Major League Baseball who previously worked as an on-field umpire in the National League from 1990 to 1999 and throughout both major leagues from 2000 to 2012.

== Umpiring career ==
Rapuano officiated in the World Series in 2001 and 2003, as well as the All-Star game in 1995 and 2008. He also worked in five League Championship Series (1999, 2000, 2002, 2004, 2005) and seven Division Series (1997, 1998, 2001, 2003, 2006, 2008, 2010), and the NL's one-game wild card playoff in 1999. He was also an umpire in the 2009 World Baseball Classic. Rapuano wore number 19 from 2000 to his retirement in 2012 (Rapuano wore number 23 during his NL tenure, but AL umpire Rick Reed had more seniority and claimed the number).

=== Controversies ===
In 2002, Rapuano made contact with New York Mets manager Bobby Valentine during an exchange in a game with the Florida Marlins. Valentine was subsequently ejected from the game and fined, although no disciplinary action was taken against Rapuano for allegedly making contact with Valentine. Rapuano acknowledged the contact, but claimed it was accidental.

In August 2009, plate umpire Rapuano ejected Philadelphia Phillies center fielder Shane Victorino for arguing balls and strikes from his position in the outfield. After calling a Rodrigo López pitch a ball, Rapuano claimed he then warned Victorino for gesturing with his arms. According to Rapuano, Victorino repeated the gesture, leading to the ejection. While Victorino did not admit to gesturing twice, he did say, "I've got to hold myself accountable. It's not something that you should be doing, but I've done it 1,000 times this year. It's not the first time -- and I'm not trying to show anybody up. Just things got built up from the half-inning before that, and it's just one of those things I let my emotions get the best of me."

=== Notable games ===
Rapuano was the home plate umpire for Kent Mercker's no-hitter on April 8, 1994.

He was at third base on August 7, 2004, for Greg Maddux's 300th win.

Rapuano was the third-base umpire for Roy Halladay's no-hitter in the 2010 National League Division Series.

He was at second base during Jered Weaver's no-hitter on May 2, 2012.

== See also ==
- List of Major League Baseball umpires (disambiguation)
