= 2001 American League Division Series =

Teams
| Team (Wins) | | Manager | Season |
| Seattle Mariners (3) | | Lou Piniella | 116–46 (.716), GA: 14 |
| Cleveland Indians (2) | | Charlie Manuel | 91–71 (.562), GA: 6 |
- Dates: October 9–15
- Television: Fox (Games 1, 3, 5); Fox Family (Games 2, 4)
- TV announcers: Josh Lewin and Rex Hudler
- Radio: ESPN
- Radio announcers: Ernie Harwell and Dave Campbell
- Umpires: Games 1–2 & 5: Steve Rippley, Ted Barrett, Kerwin Danley, Jerry Layne, Mark Hirschbeck, Ron Kulpa; Games 3–4: Dana DeMuth, Jeff Nelson, Paul Schrieber, Rick Reed, Ed Rapuano, Greg Gibson

Teams
| Team (Wins) | | Manager | Season |
| New York Yankees (3) | | Joe Torre | 95–65 (.594), GA: 13 1/2 |
| Oakland Athletics (2) | | Art Howe | 102–60 (.630), GB: 14 |
- Dates: October 10–15
- Television: Fox
- TV announcers: Joe Buck and Tim McCarver (Games 1–2); Thom Brennaman and Steve Lyons (Games 3–5)
- Radio: ESPN
- Radio announcers: Dan Shulman and Rob Dibble
- Umpires: Games 1–2 & 5: Dana DeMuth, Jeff Nelson, Paul Schrieber, Rick Reed, Ed Rapuano, Greg Gibson; Games 3–4: Steve Rippley, Ted Barrett, Kerwin Danley, Jerry Layne, Mark Hirschbeck, Ron Kulpa

The 2001 American League Division Series (ALDS) consisted of two best-of-five playoff series on the American League side in Major League Baseball’s (MLB) 2001 postseason, began on Tuesday, October 9, and ended on Monday, October 15, with the champions of the three AL divisions—along with a "wild card" team—participating in two series.

Under MLB's playoff format, no two teams from the same division were matched up in the Division Series, regardless of whether their records would normally indicate such a matchup. Home field advantage went to the team with the better regular-season record with the exception of the wild card team, which defers home field advantage regardless of record. The matchups were:

- (1) Seattle Mariners (AL West champions) vs. (3) Cleveland Indians (AL Central champions): Mariners won the series, 3–2.
- (2) New York Yankees (AL East champions) vs. (4) Oakland Athletics (Wild Card qualifier): Yankees won the series, 3–2.

The higher seeded team in each series hosts Games 1, 2, and 5 (if necessary), and the lower seeded team hosts Games 3 and 4 (if necessary).

The Mariners and Yankees went on to meet in the AL Championship Series (ALCS) for the second consecutive year. The Yankees became the American League champion for the fourth straight year, and lost to the National League champion Arizona Diamondbacks in the 2001 World Series, ending their reign as three-time defending World Series champions.

This was the first time that both Division Series winners in the same league advanced to the League Championship Series after overcoming a 2–1 series deficit in the same year.

== Matchups ==
=== Seattle Mariners vs. Cleveland Indians ===
Seattle won the series, 3–2.

| Game | Date | Score | Location | Time | Attendance |
|---|---|---|---|---|---|
| 1 | October 9 | Cleveland Indians – 5, Seattle Mariners – 0 | Safeco Field | 3:05 | 48,033 |
| 2 | October 11 | Cleveland Indians – 1, Seattle Mariners – 5 | Safeco Field | 2:41 | 48,052 |
| 3 | October 13 | Seattle Mariners – 2, Cleveland Indians – 17 | Jacobs Field | 3:24 | 45,069 |
| 4 | October 14 | Seattle Mariners – 6, Cleveland Indians – 2 | Jacobs Field | 3:16 | 45,025 |
| 5 | October 15 | Cleveland Indians – 1, Seattle Mariners – 3 | Safeco Field | 3:18 | 47,867 |

=== New York Yankees vs. Oakland Athletics ===
New York won the series, 3–2.

| Game | Date | Score | Location | Time | Attendance |
|---|---|---|---|---|---|
| 1 | October 10 | Oakland Athletics – 5, New York Yankees – 3 | Yankee Stadium (I) | 3:45 | 56,697 |
| 2 | October 11 | Oakland Athletics – 2, New York Yankees – 0 | Yankee Stadium (I) | 3:24 | 56,684 |
| 3 | October 13 | New York Yankees – 1, Oakland Athletics – 0 | Network Associates Coliseum | 2:42 | 55,861 |
| 4 | October 14 | New York Yankees – 9, Oakland Athletics – 2 | Network Associates Coliseum | 4:13 | 43,681 |
| 5 | October 15 | Oakland Athletics – 3, New York Yankees – 5 | Yankee Stadium (I) | 3:23 | 56,642 |

== Seattle vs. Cleveland ==
=== Game 1 ===
October 9, 2001 1:20 pm (PDT) at Safeco Field in Seattle, Washington 55 °F (13 °C), Roof open; cloudy
| Team | 1 | 2 | 3 | 4 | 5 | 6 | 7 | 8 | 9 | R | H | E |
|---|---|---|---|---|---|---|---|---|---|---|---|---|
| Cleveland | 0 | 0 | 0 | 3 | 0 | 1 | 0 | 1 | 0 | 5 | 11 | 1 |
| Seattle | 0 | 0 | 0 | 0 | 0 | 0 | 0 | 0 | 0 | 0 | 6 | 1 |
WP: Bartolo Colón (1–0) LP: Freddy García (0–1); Home runs: CLE: Ellis Burks (1); SEA: None; Attendance: 48,033; Boxscore

In the opener on Tuesday afternoon in Seattle, the Indians held the Mariners scoreless. Bartolo Colón pitched brilliantly, giving up six hits and no runs in eight innings while fanning ten. The highlight for Seattle was the hitting performance of Ichiro Suzuki, who went 3 for 4 in his playoff debut. Roberto Alomar doubled off Freddy Garcia to leadoff the fourth, then scored on Juan Gonzalez's single. A single and walk loaded the bases before back-to-back RBI singles by Travis Fryman and Marty Cordova made it 3–0 Indians. In the sixth, three consecutive one-out singles made it 4–0. Ellis Burks's leadoff home run in the eighth off Jose Paniagua made it 5–0, the final score.

=== Game 2 ===
October 11, 2001 1:20 pm (PDT) at Safeco Field in Seattle, Washington 55 °F (13 °C), Roof open; Mostly Cloudy
| Team | 1 | 2 | 3 | 4 | 5 | 6 | 7 | 8 | 9 | R | H | E |
|---|---|---|---|---|---|---|---|---|---|---|---|---|
| Cleveland | 0 | 0 | 0 | 0 | 0 | 0 | 1 | 0 | 0 | 1 | 6 | 0 |
| Seattle | 4 | 0 | 0 | 0 | 1 | 0 | 0 | 0 | X | 5 | 6 | 0 |
WP: Jamie Moyer (1–0) LP: Chuck Finley (0–1); Home runs: CLE: None; SEA: Mike Cameron (1), Edgar Martínez (1), David Bell (1); Attendance: 48,052; Boxscore

Seattle scored four runs in the first inning of the Thursday afternoon game with a pair of two-run blasts before an out was recorded; Mike Cameron to left after a rare walk to Ichiro Suzuki and Edgar Martínez to center following a Bret Boone single. David Bell added an insurance homer to left in the fifth, and Cleveland starter Chuck Finley lasted only 4 1/3 innings. Jamie Moyer kept the Indians at bay in the sun and shadows with one run in six-plus innings, and the trio of Jeff Nelson, Arthur Rhodes, and Kazuhiro Sasaki sealed the deal out of the bullpen. The Indians scored their only run in the seventh on a bases-loaded double play from Marty Cordova off Nelson; the run was charged to Moyer.

=== Game 3 ===
October 13, 2001 4:20 pm (EDT) at Jacobs Field in Cleveland, Ohio 78 °F (26 °C), Partly Cloudy
| Team | 1 | 2 | 3 | 4 | 5 | 6 | 7 | 8 | 9 | R | H | E |
|---|---|---|---|---|---|---|---|---|---|---|---|---|
| Seattle | 1 | 0 | 0 | 0 | 0 | 0 | 1 | 0 | 0 | 2 | 7 | 3 |
| Cleveland | 2 | 2 | 4 | 0 | 1 | 3 | 0 | 5 | X | 17 | 19 | 0 |
WP: CC Sabathia (1–0) LP: Aaron Sele (0–1); Home runs: SEA: None; CLE: Juan González (1), Kenny Lofton (1), Jim Thome (1); Attendance: 45,069; Boxscore

The Mariners drew first blood early on after a bases-loaded walk by John Olerud off CC Sabathia drove in a run, but Seattle did not score again until the seventh on Ichiro Suzuki's RBI single with two on. Sabathia pitched six innings while four Indian relieves held the Mariners scoreless over the final three innings. In the bottom of the first, a one-out single by Omar Vizquel off Aaron Sele was followed by an RBI double by Roberto Alomar and RBI single by Juan González. Next inning, an error and single was followed by Vizquel's two-run triple, both runs unearned. In the third, Seattle reliever Paul Abbott allowed a leadoff home run to González, then after two strikeouts and two singles, Einar Diaz drove in a run with a single. A walk loaded the bases before Vizquel's single and Alomar's walk made it 8–1.

Abbott pitched a scoreless fourth before allowing a home run to Kenny Lofton in the fifth. Jim Thome's leadoff home run in the sixth made it 10–1. After two walks, John Halama relieved Abbott and allowed an RBI single to Jolbert Cabrera and sacrifice fly to Lofton. Sele was charged with four runs on five hits in two innings, while Abbott was charged with eight runs on nine hits and five walks in three innings, but the Indians piled on in the eighth. José Paniagua got two outs, then loaded the bases on a hit-by-pitch and two walks. Vizquel cleared them with a double before consecutive RBI doubles by Alomar and González capped the scoring at 17–2. Up two games to one in this series, the Indians were ready to pull one of the greatest upsets in sports history.

=== Game 4 ===
October 14, 2001 1:12 pm (EDT) at Jacobs Field in Cleveland, Ohio 58 °F (14 °C), Chance of showers
| Team | 1 | 2 | 3 | 4 | 5 | 6 | 7 | 8 | 9 | R | H | E |
|---|---|---|---|---|---|---|---|---|---|---|---|---|
| Seattle | 0 | 0 | 0 | 0 | 0 | 0 | 3 | 1 | 2 | 6 | 11 | 0 |
| Cleveland | 0 | 1 | 0 | 0 | 0 | 0 | 1 | 0 | 0 | 2 | 5 | 2 |
WP: Freddy García (1–1) LP: Bartolo Colón (1–1); Home runs: SEA: Edgar Martínez (2); CLE: Juan González (2); Attendance: 45,025; Boxscore

Facing elimination on Sunday afternoon, the Mariners called on Freddy García to go up against Bartolo Colón in a Game 1 rematch, both on only three days rest. The first pitch was delayed two hours by rain. In the bottom of the second, García allowed a leadoff home run to Juan González; Colón pitched six shutout innings, but loaded the bases in the seventh with no outs with a walk, single, and another walk. Pinch hitter Al Martin grounded to Jim Thome at first, who threw home for the first out. A sacrifice fly to the left field corner by David Bell tied the game, then back-to-back RBI singles through the infield to right by Ichiro Suzuki and Mark McLemore put the Mariners up 3–1. Danys Baez relieved Colón and retired Edgar Martínez with a fielder's choice to shortstop Omar Vizquel to end the threat.

Gonzalez led off the bottom of the seventh with a double to center and advanced to third on Thome's groundout to second. Jeff Nelson relieved García, and Ellis Burks' check swing on a high pitch resulted in a strikeout, but the ball went off the top of new catcher Tom Lampkin's glove to the backstop and Burks was safe at first, but González held at third. Travis Fryman's groundout glanced off Nelson's glove which disrupted a double play; shortstop McLemore had to adjust and the Mariners got the out at second, but Fryman beat out Bret Boone's throw to first and González scored. Arthur Rhodes relieved Nelson and Wil Cordero flew out deep to left.

Seattle got that run back in the eighth: after Boone struck out, John Olerud singled up the middle, and Stan Javier grounded a fielder's choice to shortstop. Mike Cameron's double to center scored Javier easily and Seattle led 4–2; lefthander Ricardo Rincón replaced Baez and struck out Lampkin on a check swing. Rhodes retired Einar Díaz and Kenny Lofton on ground outs to first; Vizquel lined a single to center and advanced on a wild pitch strike in the dirt. Roberto Alomar flew out, caught by a sprinting Suzuki in right center.

In the ninth, Bell lined out to left, Suzuki singled up the middle, and McLemore was caught looking on a slider. Paul Shuey relieved Rincón to face Martínez, who turned an inside pitch into a home run, high and deep down the left field line, to put the Mariners up 6–2. Boone singled and stole second, but Olerud struck out. Seattle closer Kazuhiro Sasaki retired the Indians in order: González was caught looking, Thome fanned, and Burks popped up to second to end the game, forcing a deciding Game 5 in Seattle on Monday afternoon.

=== Game 5 ===
October 15, 2001 1:20 pm (PDT) at Safeco Field in Seattle, Washington 54 °F (12 °C), Roof open; Cloudy
| Team | 1 | 2 | 3 | 4 | 5 | 6 | 7 | 8 | 9 | R | H | E |
|---|---|---|---|---|---|---|---|---|---|---|---|---|
| Cleveland | 0 | 0 | 1 | 0 | 0 | 0 | 0 | 0 | 0 | 1 | 4 | 0 |
| Seattle | 0 | 2 | 0 | 0 | 0 | 0 | 1 | 0 | X | 3 | 9 | 1 |
WP: Jamie Moyer (2–0) LP: Chuck Finley (0–2) Sv: Kazuhiro Sasaki (1); Attendance: 47,867; Boxscore

In a must-win game for both sides on Monday afternoon, Seattle came out on top and advanced to the ALCS for the third time in their history, and avenged their loss to the Indians in the 1995 ALCS.

In the bottom of the second, the Mariners loaded the bases off Chuck Finley with no outs, as Edgar Martínez and John Olerud walked, and Mike Cameron was hit by a pitch while looking to bunt. Dan Wilson fanned and David Bell was caught looking, but Mark McLemore lined his first pitch to left to score two. He was caught off first and while in a rundown, Cameron broke from third but made the third out at home in a collision with catcher Einar Díaz. In the top of the third, Travis Fryman led off with a double to left-center and advanced to third on Marty Cordova's fly to right. Díaz walked, and Kenny Lofton's single up the middle scored Fryman. Omar Vizquel bunted so well it was a single to load the bases with one out. On the first pitch, Roberto Alomar grounded to third, enabling a 5-4-3 double play; he had also hit into a double play to end Cleveland's first inning.

The Mariners threatened in the fifth with two singles and a walk to load the bases with one out, and Finley was relieved by David Riske; Bret Boone struck out and Martínez grounded to short for a fielder's choice.

Seattle starter Jamie Moyer got his second win of the series, going six innings with six strikeouts, one walk, and yielding only one run. Jeff Nelson relieved him in the seventh and retired the side in order, striking out Juan González and Ellis Burks, then inducing Jim Thome to ground out to second on a full count. In the bottom of the inning, Ichiro Suzuki beat out his second leadoff infield hit to shortstop, and Stan Javier bunted him over again. Ricardo Rincón was relieved by Danys Baez, who struck out Boone. With two outs, Martínez's line drive single to left center scored Suzuki from second and put the Mariners up 3–1. Olerud lashed a single to right, and Al Martin pinch ran for Martínez at second, but Cameron lined out to center.

In the eighth, Fryman was caught looking on full count, Cordova fanned on a check swing, then Díaz laced a single up the middle on full count. Lefthander Arthur Rhodes replaced Nelson and Lofton flew out to center field, near the warning track. In the bottom half, Baez struck out the side (Wilson, Bell, McLemore). Seattle closer Kazuhiro Sasaki retired Cleveland in order in the ninth for the save: Vizquel grounded out to first, Alomar struck out swinging, and González grounded to third to end the series.

For the Indians, it marked the third time in six seasons they had lost the ALDS, following defeats in 1996 and 1999. After their offensive outburst of 17 runs in the third game, they managed only three runs and nine hits over the last two games. A perennial playoff team throughout the late 1990s, Cleveland did not return to the postseason until 2007.

This was the Mariners' most recent playoff series win until 2022, and was their last home playoff victory until Game 2 of the 2025 ALDS.

=== Composite box ===
2001 ALDS (3–2): Seattle Mariners over Cleveland Indians

| Team | 1 | 2 | 3 | 4 | 5 | 6 | 7 | 8 | 9 | R | H | E |
|---|---|---|---|---|---|---|---|---|---|---|---|---|
| Seattle Mariners | 5 | 2 | 0 | 0 | 1 | 0 | 5 | 1 | 2 | 16 | 39 | 5 |
| Cleveland Indians | 2 | 3 | 5 | 3 | 1 | 4 | 2 | 6 | 0 | 26 | 45 | 3 |
Total attendance: 234,046 Average attendance: 46,809

== New York vs. Oakland ==
=== Game 1 ===
October 10, 2001 8:17 pm (EDT) at Yankee Stadium in Bronx, New York 65 °F (18 °C), Mostly Cloudy
| Team | 1 | 2 | 3 | 4 | 5 | 6 | 7 | 8 | 9 | R | H | E |
|---|---|---|---|---|---|---|---|---|---|---|---|---|
| Oakland | 1 | 0 | 0 | 1 | 0 | 0 | 1 | 2 | 0 | 5 | 10 | 1 |
| New York | 0 | 0 | 0 | 0 | 1 | 0 | 0 | 2 | 0 | 3 | 10 | 1 |
WP: Mark Mulder (1–0) LP: Roger Clemens (0–1) Sv: Jason Isringhausen (1); Home runs: OAK: Terrence Long 2 (2), Jason Giambi (1); NYY: Tino Martinez (1); Attendance: 56,697; Boxscore

Roger Clemens, coming off a 20–3 regular season record, struggled in Game 1, lasting four innings while giving up two runs. Johnny Damon singled to lead off the first, stole second, moved to third on a groundout, and scored on Jason Giambi's sacrifice fly. Terrence Long then homered in the fourth.

The Yankees got on the board in the fifth when Alfonso Soriano singled with two outs off Mark Mulder, stole second, and scored on Chuck Knoblauch's single.

Sterling Hitchcock, Clemens' replacement, gave up two more runs, home runs to Jason Giambi in the seventh and Terrence Long's second of the game in the eighth. Jay Witasick relieved Hitchcock and walked Ramón Hernández. Frank Menechino hit into a forceout, moved to third on Damon's single and scored on Miguel Tejada's sacrifice fly.

The Yankees trailed 5–1 in the bottom of the eighth when Bernie Williams singled with one out off Jim Mecir, then Tino Martinez blasted a two-run home run that brought them within two. Jason Isringhausen, however, sat the Yankees down in order in the bottom of the ninth for Oakland.

=== Game 2 ===
October 11, 2001 8:45 pm (EDT) at Yankee Stadium in Bronx, New York 67 °F (19 °C), Fair
| Team | 1 | 2 | 3 | 4 | 5 | 6 | 7 | 8 | 9 | R | H | E |
|---|---|---|---|---|---|---|---|---|---|---|---|---|
| Oakland | 0 | 0 | 0 | 1 | 0 | 0 | 0 | 0 | 1 | 2 | 9 | 0 |
| New York | 0 | 0 | 0 | 0 | 0 | 0 | 0 | 0 | 0 | 0 | 7 | 1 |
WP: Tim Hudson (1–0) LP: Andy Pettitte (0–1) Sv: Jason Isringhausen (2); Home runs: OAK: Ron Gant (1); NYY: None; Attendance: 56,684; Boxscore

With Paul McCartney in the crowd, Andy Pettitte pitched well in Game 2, giving up one run in six innings, but Tim Hudson pitched better, pitching eight shutout innings. Oakland scored first on a Ron Gant homer in the fourth—just as McCartney was shown on television—and tacked on an insurance run off Mariano Rivera in the top of the ninth when Johnny Damon tripled with one out and scored on Scott Brosius's error. Jason Isringhausen got the save for the second straight night as the Yankees got the first two runners on base before wasting three opportunities to tie or win it.

The Yankees were now in a two-games-to-none hole and the Athletics were just one win away from advancing to the ALCS for the first time since 1992.

=== Game 3 ===
October 13, 2001 4:50 pm (PDT) at Network Associates Coliseum in Oakland, California 82 °F (28 °C), Sunny
| Team | 1 | 2 | 3 | 4 | 5 | 6 | 7 | 8 | 9 | R | H | E |
|---|---|---|---|---|---|---|---|---|---|---|---|---|
| New York | 0 | 0 | 0 | 0 | 1 | 0 | 0 | 0 | 0 | 1 | 2 | 0 |
| Oakland | 0 | 0 | 0 | 0 | 0 | 0 | 0 | 0 | 0 | 0 | 6 | 1 |
WP: Mike Mussina (1–0) LP: Barry Zito (0–1) Sv: Mariano Rivera (1); Home runs: NYY: Jorge Posada (1); OAK: None; Attendance: 55,861; Boxscore

This series is notable for a defensive play in the seventh inning of Game 3. With Oakland holding a 2–0 series lead and on the verge of completing a sweep, the Yankees took a 1–0 lead into the bottom of the seventh inning behind a strong performance from Mike Mussina and Jorge Posada's home run in the fifth (Shane Spencer followed with a double for the Yankees' only other hit of the game). With two outs and Jeremy Giambi on first base, Terrence Long hit a line drive into the right field corner. With Giambi rounding third base, right fielder Shane Spencer's throw missed both cut-off men. It appeared that Giambi would score easily, tying the game, when the shortstop Derek Jeter, while running across the diamond, reached out, cradled the ball, and shovel passed it to catcher Jorge Posada. Posada tagged Giambi, who attempted to jump over the tag as opposed to sliding around it. ESPN ranks this play as the 45th most memorable moment of the last 25 years. It was replayed countless times over the following years, including as part of filmmaker Ken Burns's documentary The Tenth Inning in September 2010. After the game, Jeter told the press that the team had been practicing this type of play all year as a result of a similarly botched throw in spring training. According to Jeter, the idea of stationing the shortstop down the first base line on balls hit to deep right field came from Yankee bench coach Don Zimmer, who was a shortstop and second baseman during his playing career; however, he stated that his initial intent was to throw the ball to third to try to get Long, and that his throw home was a reaction play. Zimmer confirmed the origin of the play's design in a conversation with Oakland's third base coach Ron Washington the next day.

The Yankees' win forced a Game 4.

=== Game 4 ===
October 14, 2001 1:42 pm (PDT) at Network Associates Coliseum in Oakland, California 89 °F (32 °C), Mostly Cloudy
| Team | 1 | 2 | 3 | 4 | 5 | 6 | 7 | 8 | 9 | R | H | E |
|---|---|---|---|---|---|---|---|---|---|---|---|---|
| New York | 0 | 2 | 2 | 3 | 0 | 0 | 0 | 0 | 2 | 9 | 11 | 1 |
| Oakland | 0 | 0 | 2 | 0 | 0 | 0 | 0 | 0 | 0 | 2 | 11 | 1 |
WP: Orlando Hernández (1–0) LP: Cory Lidle (0–1); Attendance: 43,681; Boxscore

With the momentum of the dramatic Game 3 on their side, the Yankees attacked early. In the second inning, with runners on first and second on two walks, Oakland second baseman F.P. Santangelo's error on Paul O'Neill's ground ball scored a run, then Scott Brosius's ground out scored another. In the next inning, the Yankees made it 4–0 on Bernie Williams's two run double. In the bottom of the inning with runners on first and second, Terrance Long's single scored a run, then after a wild pitch, Jeremy Giambi's groundout scored another. However, Orlando Hernández allowed no other runs in his 5 2/3 inning pitched, and Mike Stanton and Ramiro Mendoza sealed the deal out of the bullpen. In the fourth, O'Neill hit a leadoff double, moved to third on a sacrifice bunt, and scored on Alfonso Soriano's single, knocking Cory Lidle out after 3 1/3 innings. Erik Hiljus walked two with two outs to load the bases, then Williams hit a two-run single off Mike Magnante. In the ninth, David Justice tripled with one out off Jeff Tam and scored on Williams' double, his fifth RBI of the game. After moving to third on a groundout, he scored on Jorge Posada's single as the Yankees 9–2 win forced a Game 5 in New York.

=== Game 5 ===
October 15, 2001 8:17 pm (EDT) at Yankee Stadium in Bronx, New York 64 °F (18 °C), Mostly clear
| Team | 1 | 2 | 3 | 4 | 5 | 6 | 7 | 8 | 9 | R | H | E |
|---|---|---|---|---|---|---|---|---|---|---|---|---|
| Oakland | 1 | 1 | 0 | 0 | 1 | 0 | 0 | 0 | 0 | 3 | 7 | 3 |
| New York | 0 | 2 | 1 | 1 | 0 | 1 | 0 | 0 | X | 5 | 10 | 1 |
WP: Mike Stanton (1–0) LP: Mark Mulder (1–1) Sv: Mariano Rivera (2); Home runs: OAK: None; NYY: David Justice (1); Attendance: 56,642; Boxscore

In Game 5, RBI singles by Jason Giambi in the first and Jeremy Giambi in the second off Roger Clemens, both coming after leadoff doubles, put Oakland up 2–0. In the bottom of the second, the Yankees loaded the bases off Mark Mulder on two singles and a hit-by-pitch before Alfonso Soriano's two-run single tied the game. Next inning, two errors by Oakland allowed the Yankees to go up 3–2. Next inning, Chuck Knoblauch hit a leadoff single, reached second on an error, moved to third on a sacrifice bunt, and scored on Derek Jeter's sacrifice fly. The A's cut the Yankees lead to 4–3 on Jason Giambi's single with two on off Mike Stanton, but the Yankees got that run back off Tim Hudson on David Justice's home run in the sixth. Roger Clemens pitched just 4 1/3 innings, but the bullpen pitched well as Mariano Rivera closed it out to send the Yankees to the ALCS for the fourth straight season.

For Oakland, it marked the second straight season they lost the ALDS to the Yankees in five games. The Yankees became the first MLB team to win a division series after losing the first two games at home. The San Francisco Giants followed in 2012, as did the Toronto Blue Jays in 2015, and the Cleveland Guardians in 2026.

In the top of the eighth inning of Game 5, Long hit a towering foul pop up in a two-run game. Jeter, running and following the ball at the same time made a backhanded grab and then turning his body, flipped into the stands. For a moment, no one knew if the ball had been caught. Here is Thom Brennaman's call of the play on Fox television:

1-1 to Terrence Long. Popped up, third base side, Brosius and Jeter both over. JETER...DID HE GET IT?! DID HE GET IT?! DID HE GET IT?! HE GOT IT! HE GOT IT! They throw to second; the runner tags and he's safe. Or are they saying he didn't get it? Now they're appealing; the first base umpire didn't know if Jeter caught it, had to ask the second base umpire and they said he caught it.

Jeter continued to play in the postseason despite a slight leg injury from the tumble.

Game 5 of the 2001 ALDS is depicted in the opening scene in the 2011 film Moneyball. The film shows Damon's first inning leadoff double followed by Jason Giambi's RBI single. However, the defensive miscues by Oakland are then shown as three errors were committed. The final out of the game (Eric Byrnes striking out) is used as a transition point from the game footage to the actual beginning of the film.

=== Composite box ===
2001 ALDS (3–2): New York Yankees over Oakland Athletics

| Team | 1 | 2 | 3 | 4 | 5 | 6 | 7 | 8 | 9 | R | H | E |
|---|---|---|---|---|---|---|---|---|---|---|---|---|
| New York Yankees | 0 | 4 | 3 | 4 | 2 | 1 | 0 | 2 | 2 | 18 | 40 | 4 |
| Oakland Athletics | 2 | 1 | 2 | 2 | 1 | 0 | 1 | 2 | 1 | 12 | 43 | 6 |
Total attendance: 269,565 Average attendance: 53,913
