= 2000 American League Division Series =

Teams
Team (Wins)		Manager	Season
Seattle Mariners (3)		Lou Piniella	91–71 (.562), GB: 1/2
Chicago White Sox (0)		Jerry Manuel	95–67 (.586), GA: 5
- Dates: October 3–6
- Television: ESPN
- TV announcers: Chris Berman and Rick Sutcliffe
- Radio: ESPN
- Radio announcers: Ernie Harwell and Dave Campbell
- Umpires: Games 1–2: Charlie Reliford, Kerwin Danley, Mike Reilly, Mike Winters, Rick Reed, Doug Eddings; Game 3: Tim Welke, Chuck Meriwether, Tim McClelland, Paul Schrieber, Al Clark, Jeff Nelson

Teams
Team (Wins)		Manager	Season
New York Yankees (3)		Joe Torre	87–74 (.540), GA: 2 1/2
Oakland Athletics (2)		Art Howe	91–70 (.565), GA: 1/2
- Dates: October 3–8
- Television: NBC (Games 1, 3–4)/Pax (Game 1); Fox (Games 2, 5)
- TV announcers: Skip Caray and Joe Morgan (Games 1, 3–4); Joe Buck and Tim McCarver (Game 2); Thom Brennaman and Bob Brenly (Game 5)
- Radio: ESPN
- Radio announcers: Dan Shulman and Buck Martinez
- Umpires: Games 1–2: Tim Welke, Chuck Meriwether, Tim McClelland, Paul Schrieber, Al Clark, Jeff Nelson; Games 3–5: Charlie Reliford, Kerwin Danley, Mike Reilly, Mike Winters, Rick Reed, Doug Eddings

The 2000 American League Division Series (ALDS) consisted of two best-of-five playoff series on the American League side in Major League Baseball’s (MLB) 2000 postseason, began on Tuesday, October 3, and ended on Sunday, October 8, with the champions of the three AL divisions—along with a "wild card" team—participating in two series.

Under MLB's playoff format, no two teams from the same division were matched up in the Division Series, regardless of whether their records would normally indicate such a matchup. Home field advantage went to the team with the better regular-season record with the exception of the wild card team, which defers home field advantage regardless of record. The matchups were:

- (1) Chicago White Sox (AL Central champions) vs. (4) Seattle Mariners (Wild Card qualifier): Mariners won the series, 3–0.
- (2) Oakland Athletics (AL West champions) vs. (3) New York Yankees (AL East champions): Yankees won the series, 3–2.

The higher seeded team in each series hosts Games 1, 2, and 5 (if necessary), and the lower seeded team hosts Games 3 and 4 (if necessary).

The defending World Series champion Yankees defeated the Mariners in the AL Championship Series. They went on to win the World Series against the National League champion New York Mets in five games, for their third consecutive championship, and fourth in five years.

== Matchups ==
=== Chicago White Sox vs. Seattle Mariners ===
Seattle won the series, 3–0.

Game	Date	Score	Location	Time	Attendance
1	October 3	Seattle Mariners – 7, Chicago White Sox – 4 (10)	Comiskey Park (II)	4:12	45,290
2	October 4	Seattle Mariners – 5, Chicago White Sox – 2	Comiskey Park (II)	3:16	45,383
3	October 6	Chicago White Sox – 1, Seattle Mariners – 2	Safeco Field	2:40	48,010

=== Oakland Athletics vs. New York Yankees ===
New York won the series, 3–2.

Game	Date	Score	Location	Time	Attendance
1	October 3	New York Yankees – 3, Oakland Athletics – 5	Network Associates Coliseum	3:04	47,360
2	October 4	New York Yankees – 4, Oakland Athletics – 0	Network Associates Coliseum	3:15	47,860
3	October 6	Oakland Athletics – 2, New York Yankees – 4	Yankee Stadium (I)	3:12	56,606
4	October 7	Oakland Athletics – 11, New York Yankees – 1	Yankee Stadium (I)	3:42	56,915
5	October 8	New York Yankees – 7, Oakland Athletics – 5	Network Associates Coliseum	3:50	41,170

== Chicago vs. Seattle ==
For the third time in the last six seasons, the Seattle Mariners were in the postseason. The Chicago White Sox returned to the postseason for the first time since 1993. This series ended with a game-winning bunt by Carlos Guillén in Game 3 to deliver Seattle to their first ALCS in five years.

=== Game 1 ===
October 3, 2000 2:07 pm (CDT) at Comiskey Park (II) in Chicago, Illinois 70 °F (21 °C), sunny
Team	1	2	3	4	5	6	7	8	9	10	R	H	E
Seattle	2	1	0	0	0	0	1	0	0	3	7	13	0
Chicago	0	2	2	0	0	0	0	0	0	0	4	9	0
WP: José Mesa (1–0) LP: Keith Foulke (0–1) Sv: Kazuhiro Sasaki (1); Home runs: SEA: Joe Oliver (1), Edgar Martínez (1), John Olerud (1); CWS: Ray Durham (1); Attendance: 45,290; Boxscore

Freddy García faced Jim Parque in the series opener in Chicago. Parque struggled early, allowing a single to Rickey Henderson and hitting Mike Cameron with a pitch to open the game. An RBI single by Alex Rodriguez moved Cameron to third and a forceout by John Olerud put the Mariners up 2–0. Joe Oliver's second-inning leadoff homer made it 3–0. However, in the bottom half, Paul Konerko drew a leadoff walk, moved to second on a groundout, and scored on a triple by Chris Singleton, who then scored on a wild pitch by García to make it a one-run game. In the bottom of the third, the Mariners' lead evaporated when Ray Durham homered to tie it, then José Valentín walked before Magglio Ordóñez tripled in the go-ahead run for Chicago.

The game remained 4–3 until the top of the seventh, when Cameron hit a two-out bases-loaded single off Chad Bradford, who had just relieved Bob Howry. That hit to right almost gave the Mariners the lead, but David Bell was thrown out at home by Ordóñez to end the inning. Seattle threatened again in the eighth and Chicago in the ninth but both times came up empty and the game moved to extra innings. In the top of the tenth, Cameron led off with a single to left field off closer Keith Foulke, then Rodriguez flew out high to left. After an unconventional conference with manager Lou Piniella and a pitchout, Cameron stole second on a 2–0 changeup, then Edgar Martínez lined the next pitch over the left field wall. On the next pitch, Olerud homered to center, and the Mariners led by three. Closer Kazuhiro Sasaki gave up a leadoff double off Bell's glove, then got a ground ball to second and struck out two for the save.

=== Game 2 ===
October 4, 2000 12:07 pm (CDT) at Comiskey Park (II) in Chicago, Illinois 61 °F (16 °C), overcast
Team	1	2	3	4	5	6	7	8	9	R	H	E
Seattle	0	2	0	1	1	0	0	0	1	5	9	1
Chicago	1	0	1	0	0	0	0	0	0	2	5	1
WP: Paul Abbott (1–0) LP: Mike Sirotka (0–1) Sv: Kazuhiro Sasaki (2); Home runs: SEA: Jay Buhner (1); CWS: None; Attendance: 45,383; Boxscore

The White Sox struck first with back-to-back leadoff doubles by Ray Durham and José Valentín off Paul Abbott, but the Mariners loaded the bases in the second off Mike Sirotka on a double, walk, and hit-by-pitch when David Bell's single and Dan Wilson's sacrifice fly scored a run each, putting them up 2−1. The White Sox tied the game in the third on Carlos Lee's sacrifice fly, but Seattle regained the lead on Jay Buhner's home run in the fourth.

The next inning, Rickey Henderson drew a leadoff walk, moved to second on a sacrifice bunt, stole third, and scored on Alex Rodriguez's groundout to make it 4−2 Mariners. In the ninth, they extended the lead to 5−2 on Mike Cameron's RBI single off Mark Buehrle that scored Mark McLemore from third, with the run charged to Bill Simas. Seattle closer Kazuhiro Sasaki struck out all three batters he faced in the bottom of the inning as the Mariners went up 2−0 and the series headed to Seattle.

=== Game 3 ===
October 6, 2000 1:07 pm (PDT) at Safeco Field in Seattle, Washington 66 °F (19 °C), roof open; sunny
Team	1	2	3	4	5	6	7	8	9	R	H	E
Chicago	0	1	0	0	0	0	0	0	0	1	3	1
Seattle	0	0	0	1	0	0	0	0	1	2	6	0
WP: José Paniagua (1–0) LP: Kelly Wunsch (0–1); Attendance: 48,010; Boxscore

In Game 3, the first postseason game at Safeco Field, James Baldwin faced Aaron Sele in the clincher. Facing elimination, the White Sox took an early 1–0 lead in the top of the second on a sacrifice fly by Herbert Perry to score Harold Baines, who had doubled and went to third on a fly out to right. In the bottom of the fourth, the Mariners tied the game on an RBI single by Stan Javier. A pitcher's duel took place and both teams struggled to score in the afternoon autumn sun, with only seven hits total in the first eight innings, tied at one run each.

Lefthander Arthur Rhodes relieved Sele in the eighth and threw one pitch, which resulted in an inning-ending double play by second baseman Mark McLemore. Rhodes struck out the first two batters in the top of the ninth and José Paniagua came in to face Frank Thomas, who was hitless in the series. After three balls, the count was worked to full but ended in a walk, then Magglio Ordóñez struck out. In the bottom of the ninth, John Olerud hit a hard line drive back at lefthander Kelly Wunsch that ricocheted off his stomach, toward the third base line; his rushed errant throw allowed Olerud to move to second. Keith Foulke relieved Wunsch and Rickey Henderson entered as a pinch runner; Javier's sacrifice bunt toward third moved Henderson to third. David Bell walked on four pitches and then pinch hitter Carlos Guillén swung and fouled off the first pitch. He then drove in the series-winning run with a walk-off drag bunt past a diving Thomas.

=== Composite box ===
2000 ALDS (3–0): Seattle Mariners over Chicago White Sox

Team	1	2	3	4	5	6	7	8	9	10	R	H	E
Seattle Mariners	2	3	0	2	1	0	1	0	2	3	14	28	1
Chicago White Sox	1	3	3	0	0	0	0	0	0	0	7	17	2
Total attendance: 138,683 Average attendance: 46,228

== Oakland vs. New York ==
=== Game 1 ===
October 3, 2000 5:08 pm (PDT) at Network Associates Coliseum in Oakland, California 65 °F (18 °C), sunny
Team	1	2	3	4	5	6	7	8	9	R	H	E
New York	0	2	0	0	0	1	0	0	0	3	7	0
Oakland	0	0	0	0	3	1	0	1	X	5	10	2
WP: Gil Heredia (1–0) LP: Roger Clemens (0–1) Sv: Jason Isringhausen (1); Attendance: 47,360; Boxscore

Opening on the road in Oakland, New York's Jorge Posada singled with two outs in the second inning off Gil Heredia, then back-to-back RBI doubles by Luis Sojo and Scott Brosius put the Yankees up 2−0. Roger Clemens allowed a single to Eric Chavez to open the inning and allowed a subsequent walk to Jeremy Giambi. Ramón Hernández's RBI single cut the Yankees' lead to 2−1, then one out later, Randy Velarde's RBI single tied the game before a wild pitch to Jason Giambi put the Athletics up 3−2. Bernie Williams doubled to lead off the top of the sixth inning, moved to second on a groundout, and scored on Tino Martinez's sacrifice fly to tie the game, but in the bottom of the inning, Chavez and Giambi hit back-to-back two-out singles before Hernandez's double scored Chavez with Giambi thrown out at home to end the inning with the Athletics up 4−3. They got an insurance run in the eighth off Mike Stanton when Miguel Tejada hit a leadoff single, moved to second on a wild pitch and scored on Chavez's single. Jason Isringhausen retired the Yankees in order in the ninth as the Athletics' 5−3 win put them up 1−0 in the series.

=== Game 2 ===
October 4, 2000 5:18 pm (PDT) at Network Associates Coliseum in Oakland, California 64 °F (18 °C), sunny
Team	1	2	3	4	5	6	7	8	9	R	H	E
New York	0	0	0	0	0	3	0	0	1	4	8	1
Oakland	0	0	0	0	0	0	0	0	0	0	6	1
WP: Andy Pettitte (1–0) LP: Kevin Appier (0–1) Sv: Mariano Rivera (1); Attendance: 47,860; Boxscore

In Game 2, Andy Pettitte pitched 7 2/3 shutout innings, allowing five hits and one walk. Mariano Rivera pitched 1 1/3 shutout innings for the save. Oakland's Kevin Appier pitched five shutout innings before allowing runners on first and third with two outs in the sixth before Glenallen Hill's single scored a run, then Luis Sojo's double scored two more to put the Yankees up 3−0. They made it 4−0 in the ninth on Clay Bellinger's RBI double with runners on first and third off Jeff Tam. The series was tied 1−1 and headed to New York.

=== Game 3 ===
October 6, 2000 8:08 pm (EDT) at Yankee Stadium (I) in Bronx, New York 66 °F (19 °C), clear
Team	1	2	3	4	5	6	7	8	9	R	H	E
Oakland	0	1	0	0	1	0	0	0	0	2	4	2
New York	0	2	0	1	0	0	0	1	X	4	6	1
WP: Orlando Hernández (1–0) LP: Tim Hudson (0–1) Sv: Mariano Rivera (2); Home runs: OAK: Terrence Long (1); NYY: None; Attendance: 56,606; Boxscore

In Game 3 in New York, the Athletics got runners on first and second on two walks off Orlando Hernandez in the second inning when Jeremy Giambi's RBI single put them up 1−0, but, in the bottom of the inning, the Yankees got runners on first and third with no outs off Tim Hudson when Glenallen Hill's fielder's choice tied the game. One out later, Scott Brosius walked to load the bases before Derek Jeter's RBI single put the Yankees up 2−1.

In the fourth, Luis Sojo drew a leadoff walk, moved to third on an error, and scored on Jeter's forceout. Terrence Long's home run in the fifth cut the Yankees' lead to one. New York extended their lead to 4−2 in the eighth on Sojo's single that scored Tino Martinez from second with Sojo tagged out at second to end the inning. Hudson pitched a complete game in a losing effort as Mariano Rivera pitched a scoreless ninth for the save, and the Yankees were one win away from the ALCS.

=== Game 4 ===
October 7, 2000 7:38 pm (EDT) at Yankee Stadium (I) in Bronx, New York 57 °F (14 °C), clear
Team	1	2	3	4	5	6	7	8	9	R	H	E
Oakland	3	0	0	0	0	3	0	1	4	11	11	0
New York	0	0	0	0	0	1	0	0	0	1	8	0
WP: Barry Zito (1–0) LP: Roger Clemens (0–2); Home runs: OAK: Olmedo Sáenz (1); NYY: None; Attendance: 56,915; Boxscore

In Game 4, Oakland, in a must-win situation, struck first when after two walks, Olmedo Sáenz's three-run home run off Roger Clemens gave them a 3−0 first-inning lead. In the sixth, Clemens allowed a leadoff single to Eric Chavez and subsequent double to Miguel Tejada before both men scored on Ben Grieve's single. Mike Stanton relieved Clemens and allowed a single to Jeremy Giambi before Grieve scored on Ramón Hernández's forceout to put the Athletics up 6−0. The Yankees scored their only run of the game in the bottom of the inning on Jorge Posada's double off Barry Zito with two runners on base.

Tejada drew a leadoff walk off Randy Choate in the eighth and stole second. After Grieve struck out, Ryan Christenson's RBI single off Dwight Gooden made it 7−1 Oakland. Gooden hit the next batter, Hernández, but escaped the inning with a double play. Oakland loaded the bases in the ninth with no outs on a double, walk, and hit-by-pitch. Chavez hit a two-run double, followed by a Tejada RBI ground out and Bo Porter RBI single. Doug Jones pitched a scoreless bottom of the ninth as the Athletics' 11−1 blowout win forced a Game 5 back in Oakland.

=== Game 5 ===
October 8, 2000 5:00 pm (PDT) at Network Associates Coliseum in Oakland, California 63 °F (17 °C), sunny
Team	1	2	3	4	5	6	7	8	9	R	H	E
New York	6	0	0	1	0	0	0	0	0	7	12	0
Oakland	0	2	1	2	0	0	0	0	0	5	13	0
WP: Mike Stanton (1–0) LP: Gil Heredia (1–1) Sv: Mariano Rivera (3); Home runs: NYY: David Justice (1); OAK: None; Attendance: 41,170; Boxscore

In Game 5 in Oakland, the Yankees loaded the bases in the top of the first inning on a walk and two singles when Bernie Williams's sacrifice fly put them up 1−0. David Justice walked to reload the bases before Tino Martinez cleared them with a double. After Jorge Posada singled, Oakland starter Gil Heredia was relieved by Jeff Tam, who allowed a sacrifice fly to Luis Sojo, then Scott Brosius singled before Chuck Knoblauch's RBI single made it 6−0. The Athletics loaded the bases in the second on two singles and a walk off Andy Pettitte when Randy Velarde's two-run single made it 6−2.

Next inning, Miguel Tejada singled with one out and scored on Eric Chavez's double, but New York got that run back on Justice's home run in the fourth off Kevin Appier---the Yankees' only home run in this series. In the bottom of the inning, the Athletics loaded the bases on two singles and a walk when back-to-back sacrifice flies by Jason Giambi and Olmedo Saenz made it 7−5. After allowing a single to Tejada, Pettitte was relieved by Mike Stanton, who pitched two shutout innings in relief to get the win. Neither team scored for the rest of the game as the Yankees' win advanced them to the ALCS. During the Yankees' run of three consecutive World Series titles from 1998 to 2000, this was the only time they faced elimination in the postseason.

=== Composite box ===
2000 ALDS (3–2): New York Yankees over Oakland Athletics

Team	1	2	3	4	5	6	7	8	9	R	H	E
New York Yankees	6	4	0	2	0	5	0	1	1	19	41	2
Oakland Athletics	3	3	1	2	4	4	0	2	4	23	44	5
Total attendance: 249,911 Average attendance: 49,982
