= 2016 Major League Baseball All-Star Game =

2016 American baseball competition

	1	2	3	4	5	6	7	8	9	R	H	E
National League	1	0	0	1	0	0	0	0	0	2	10	1
American League	0	3	1	0	0	0	0	0	X	4	8	1
- Date: July 12, 2016
- Venue: Petco Park
- City: San Diego, California
- Managers: Terry Collins (NYM); Ned Yost (KC)
- MVP: Eric Hosmer (KC)
- Attendance: 42,386
- Ceremonial first pitch: Randy Jones
- Television: Fox (United States); MLB International (International)
- TV announcers: Joe Buck, John Smoltz, Ken Rosenthal and Tom Verducci (Fox); Matt Vasgersian and Mark DeRosa (MLB International)
- Radio: ESPN
- Radio announcers: Jon Sciambi and Chris Singleton

The 2016 Major League Baseball All-Star Game was the 87th edition of the Major League Baseball All-Star Game. The game was hosted by the San Diego Padres and was played at Petco Park on July 12, 2016. It was televised nationally on Fox. The American League All-Stars defeated the National League All-Stars by a score of 4–2 to win home field advantage for the 2016 World Series (which went to the Cleveland Indians). This was also the last time home-field advantage for the World Series was determined by the outcome of the All-Star Game.

The host city was announced on January 15, 2015, by then-Major League Baseball commissioner Bud Selig. This was the third time the city of San Diego hosted the All-Star Game and the first time since 1992.

Eric Hosmer, an infielder for the Kansas City Royals, was named the 2016 All-Star Game Most Valuable Player.

== Host selection ==
The Baltimore Orioles were also in line for hosting the game. Former commissioner Bud Selig said that Baltimore was a prime candidate to host the event, but the Padres ended up with the game. Petco Park opened in 2004 and hosted the 2006 World Baseball Classic championship round. Because National League parks had been selected to host four straight games from 2015–2018, skipping an American League park in 2016 and 2018 in the traditional alternating system, the AL team was designated as the home team.

== Fan balloting ==
=== Starters ===
Balloting for the 2016 All-Star Game starters began online April 24 and ended on June 30. The top vote-getters at each position (including the designated hitter for the American League) and the top three among outfielders, were named the starters for their respective leagues. The results were announced on July 5. Salvador Pérez was the leading vote-getter with 4,965,838 votes.

=== Final roster spot ===
After the rosters are finalized, a second ballot of five players per league was created for the All-Star Final Vote to determine the 34th and final player of each roster. The online balloting was conducted from July 5 through July 8. The winners of the All-Star Final Vote were Michael Saunders of the American League's Toronto Blue Jays and Brandon Belt of the National League's San Francisco Giants.

Player	Team	Pos.	Player	Team	Pos.
American League			National League		
Ian Kinsler	Tigers	2B	Brandon Belt	Giants	1B
Evan Longoria	Rays	3B	Ryan Braun	Brewers	OF
Dustin Pedroia	Red Sox	2B	Jake Lamb	Diamondbacks	3B
Michael Saunders	Blue Jays	OF	Starling Marte	Pirates	OF
George Springer	Astros	OF	Trevor Story	Rockies	SS

== Rosters ==
Players in italics have since been inducted into the National Baseball Hall of Fame.

=== American League ===
Elected starters
Position	Player	Team	All-Star Games
C	Salvador Pérez	Royals	4
1B	Eric Hosmer	Royals	1
2B	Jose Altuve	Astros	4
3B	Manny Machado	Orioles	3
SS	Xander Bogaerts	Red Sox	1
OF	Mike Trout	Angels	5
OF	Jackie Bradley Jr.	Red Sox	1
OF	Mookie Betts	Red Sox	1
DH	David Ortiz	Red Sox	10

Reserves
Position	Player	Team	All-Star Games
C	Stephen Vogt	Athletics	2
C	Matt Wieters	Orioles	4
1B	Miguel Cabrera	Tigers	11
2B	Robinson Canó	Mariners	7
3B	Josh Donaldson	Blue Jays	3
SS	Eduardo Núñez	Twins	1
SS	Francisco Lindor	Indians	1
OF	Carlos Beltrán	Yankees	9
OF	Ian Desmond	Rangers	2
OF	Michael Saunders	Blue Jays	1
OF	Mark Trumbo	Orioles	2
DH	Edwin Encarnación	Blue Jays	3

Pitchers
Player	Team	All-Star Games
Dellin Betances	Yankees	3
Brad Brach	Orioles	1
Zach Britton	Orioles	2
Álex Colomé	Rays	1
Wade Davis^{#}	Royals	2
Marco Estrada^{#}	Blue Jays	1
Cole Hamels	Rangers	4
Will Harris	Astros	1
Kelvin Herrera	Royals	2
Craig Kimbrel^{#}	Red Sox	5
Corey Kluber^{[A]}	Indians	1
Andrew Miller	Yankees	1
José Quintana^{[K]}	White Sox	1
Danny Salazar^{#}	Indians	1
Chris Sale	White Sox	5
Aaron Sanchez^{[J]}	Blue Jays	1
Steven Wright	Red Sox	1

=== National League ===
Elected starters
Position	Player	Team	All-Star Games
C	Buster Posey	Giants	4
1B	Anthony Rizzo	Cubs	3
2B	Ben Zobrist	Cubs	3
3B	Kris Bryant	Cubs	2
SS	Addison Russell	Cubs	1
OF	Yoenis Céspedes^{#}	Mets	2
OF	Dexter Fowler^{#}	Cubs	1
OF	Bryce Harper	Nationals	4

Reserves
Position	Player	Team	All-Star Games
C	Jonathan Lucroy	Brewers	2
C	Wilson Ramos	Nationals	1
1B	Paul Goldschmidt	Diamondbacks	4
1B	Wil Myers	Padres	1
1B	Brandon Belt	Giants	1
2B	Daniel Murphy	Nationals	2
3B	Nolan Arenado	Rockies	2
3B	Matt Carpenter^{#}	Cardinals	3
SS	Aledmys Díaz^{[B]}	Cardinals	1
SS	Corey Seager	Dodgers	1
OF	Jay Bruce^{[F]}	Reds	3
OF	Adam Duvall	Reds	1
OF	Carlos González^{[E]}	Rockies	3
OF	Odubel Herrera	Phillies	1
OF	Starling Marte^{[H]}	Pirates	1
OF	Marcell Ozuna^{[G]}	Marlins	1

Pitchers
Player	Team	All-Star Games
Jake Arrieta	Cubs	1
Madison Bumgarner^{#}	Giants	4
Bartolo Colón^{[C]}	Mets	4
Johnny Cueto	Giants	2
Jeurys Familia	Mets	1
José Fernández	Marlins	2
Kenley Jansen	Dodgers	1
Clayton Kershaw^{#}	Dodgers	6
Jon Lester	Cubs	4
Mark Melancon	Pirates	3
Drew Pomeranz^{[I]}	Padres	1
A. J. Ramos	Marlins	1
Fernando Rodney	Marlins	3
Max Scherzer^{[D]}	Nationals	4
Stephen Strasburg^{#}	Nationals	2
Noah Syndergaard^{#}	Mets	1
Julio Teherán	Braves	2

1. Corey Kluber was named as the roster replacement for Marco Estrada due to injury.
2. Aledmys Díaz was named as the roster replacement for Matt Carpenter due to injury.
3. Bartolo Colón was named as the roster replacement for Madison Bumgarner due to Bumgarner starting on Sunday.
4. Max Scherzer was named as the roster replacement for Stephen Strasburg due to Strasburg just recently coming off of the DL.
5. Carlos González was named starter in place of Dexter Fowler due to injury.
6. Jay Bruce was named as the roster replacement for Dexter Fowler.
7. Marcell Ozuna was named starter in place of Yoenis Céspedes due to injury.
8. Starling Marte was named as the roster replacement for Yoenis Céspedes.
9. Drew Pomeranz was named as the roster replacement for Noah Syndergaard due to injury.
10. Aaron Sanchez was named as the roster replacement for Craig Kimbrel due to injury.
11. José Quintana was named as the roster replacement for Danny Salazar due to injury.

#: Indicates player would not play (replaced as per reference notes above).

== Game summary ==
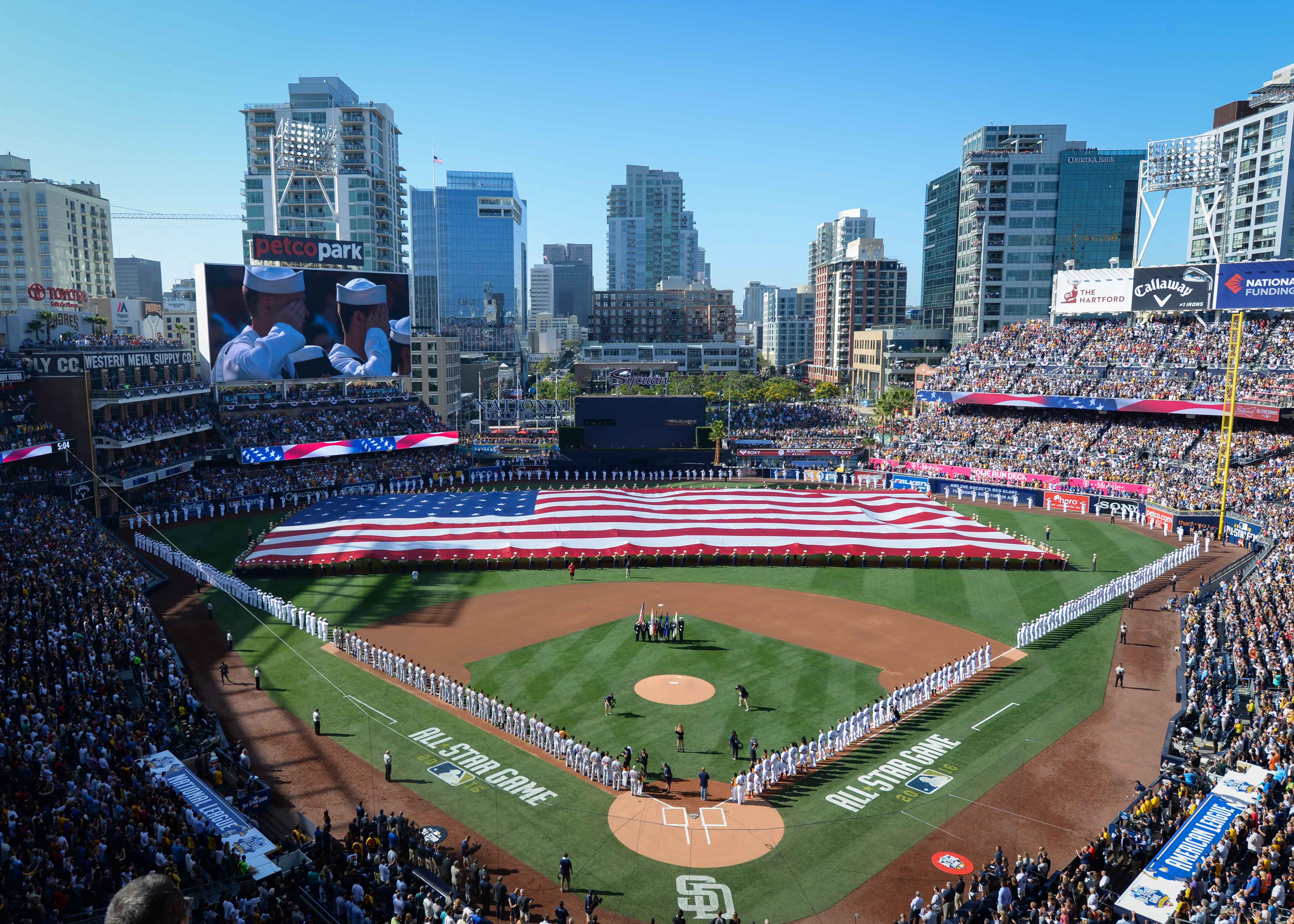
Pre-game ceremonies at Petco Park

The NL got off to a quick start against Chris Sale when Kris Bryant homered in the top of the first. In the bottom of the second inning, the AL got to Johnny Cueto when Eric Hosmer homered to left to tie the game. Two batters later, Salvador Pérez hit a two-run shot to give the AL a 3–1 lead.

In the bottom of the third, after walking, David Ortiz was replaced by Edwin Encarnación and left the field to a standing ovation in his final all-star game. The AL would tack on another run in this inning when Hosmer hit an RBI single off José Fernández, driving in Encarnacion to give the AL a 4–1 lead. The NL shrunk the lead with an RBI single by Marcell Ozuna in the top of the fourth off Aaron Sanchez. However, this would be all the runs scored in the game, as the National League stranded 10 baserunners throughout the game.

In the top of the eighth, the NL loaded the bases, but could not capitalize when Aledmys Díaz struck out looking against Will Harris to end the frame. In the ninth, Zach Britton got Nolan Arenado to ground into a double play to secure the 4–2 victory for the American League.

=== Starting lineup ===
National				American			
Order	Player	Team	Position	Order	Player	Team	Position
1	Ben Zobrist	Cubs	2B	1	Jose Altuve	Astros	2B
2	Bryce Harper	Nationals	RF	2	Mike Trout	Angels	CF
3	Kris Bryant	Cubs	3B	3	Manny Machado	Orioles	3B
4	Wil Myers	Padres	DH	4	David Ortiz	Red Sox	DH
5	Buster Posey	Giants	C	5	Xander Bogaerts	Red Sox	SS
6	Anthony Rizzo	Cubs	1B	6	Eric Hosmer	Royals	1B
7	Marcell Ozuna	Marlins	CF	7	Mookie Betts	Red Sox	RF
8	Carlos González	Rockies	LF	8	Salvador Pérez	Royals	C
9	Addison Russell	Cubs	SS	9	Jackie Bradley Jr.	Red Sox	LF
	Johnny Cueto	Giants	P		Chris Sale	White Sox	P

=== Line score ===
Tuesday, July 12, 2016 5:21 pm (PDT) Petco Park in San Diego, California, 72 °F (22 °C), clear and windy
Team	1	2	3	4	5	6	7	8	9	R	H	E
National League	1	0	0	1	0	0	0	0	0	2	10	1
American League	0	3	1	0	0	0	0	0	X	4	8	1
Starting pitchers: NL: Johnny Cueto; AL: Chris Sale; WP: Corey Kluber (1–0) LP: Johnny Cueto (0–1) Sv: Zach Britton (1); Home runs: NL: Kris Bryant (1); AL: Eric Hosmer, Salvador Pérez (1); Attendance: 42,386 Time: 3:05; Umpires: Home Plate – Mike Winters; First Base – Kerwin Danley; Second Base – Marty Foster; Third Base – Bill Welke; Left Field – Adrian Johnson; Right Field – Dan Bellino; Replay Official – Sam Holbrook

== Controversies ==
Prior to the game, The Tenors performed the Canadian national anthem, "O Canada". As in many previous years, the performance of the Canadian anthem was replaced in the Fox broadcast in the United States with commercial break of the Fox broadcast prior to the singing of "The Star-Spangled Banner" in a performance by Rachel Platten, but it was carried on ESPN Radio in the U.S. and Sportsnet in Canada.

During a solo, group member Remigio Pereira altered the lyrics to "O Canada" to criticize the Black Lives Matter movement, singing "We're all brothers and sisters, all lives matter to the great", and holding up a sign on cardboard reading "ALL LIVES MATTER". The English lyric normally sung at that point is "With glowing hearts we see thee rise, the True North strong and free;" however the remainder of the lyrics sung were in keeping with the official bilingual (English-French) version. Later that evening, Pereira, a co-founder of the group, was denounced by the group as a "lone wolf", leading to an announcement that he would not be performing with The Tenors until further notice, and eventually removed permanently from the group.

== See also ==
- List of Major League Baseball All-Star Games
- All-Star Futures Game
- Home Run Derby
