= Rich Rieker =

American baseball umpire (born 1961)

- Born: November 9, 1961 (age 63); St. Louis, Missouri, U.S.
- Occupation(s): MLB umpire Director of Umpire Development
- Years active: 1992–present
- Height: 6 ft 2 in (1.88 m)

Richard Gregory Rieker (born November 9, 1961) is an American baseball executive working as the Director of Umpire Development for Major League Baseball (MLB).

== Career ==
Rieker spent thirteen seasons as a minor league umpire. Rieker made major league appearances as early as 1992 and he joined the National League full-time in 1996, after the death of John McSherry. Rieker worked throughout both major leagues in 2000 and 2001. He wore uniform number 16 during his National League career, then switched to number 38 after the National League and American League umpiring staffs merged in 2000.

Rieker umpired 1,001 regular season major league games in his 10-year career. He umpired in two division series (1999 and 2000), and the 1998 All-Star Game. Rieker was behind the plate when Mark McGwire hit his record-setting 69th and 70th home runs on September 27, 1998.

Since 2001, Rieker moved up to a supervisory role at Major League Baseball and in 2011 was named Director of Umpire Development.

== Personal life ==
Rieker has an undergraduate degree in business from the University of Missouri–St. Louis. He lives in Orlando, Florida.

== See also ==
- List of Major League Baseball umpires (disambiguation)
