= Paul Schrieber =

American baseball umpire (1966–2020)

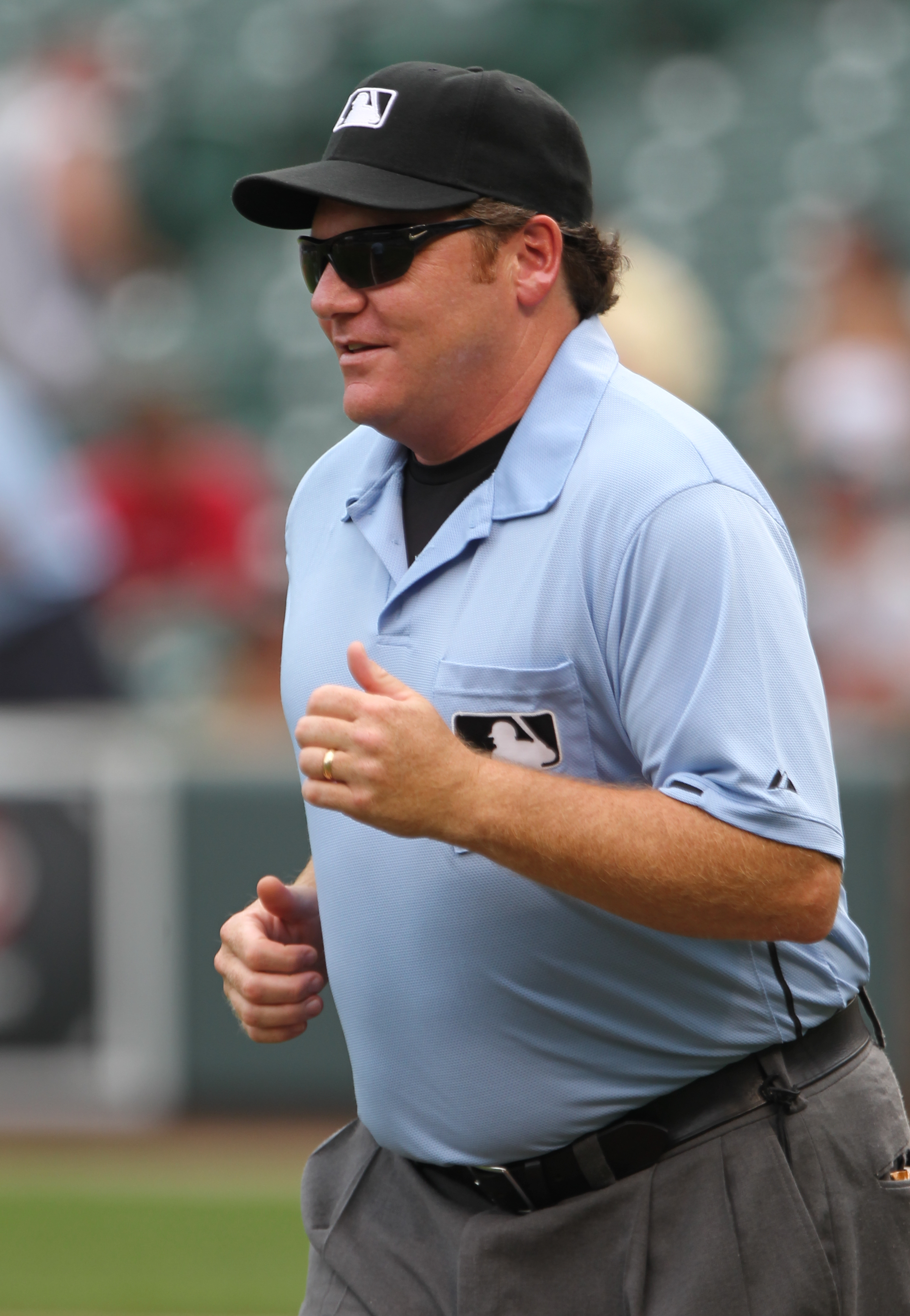
- Schrieber in 2011
- Born: June 30, 1966; Eugene, Oregon, U.S.
- Died: November 12, 2020 (aged 54); Scottsdale, Arizona, U.S.
- Occupation: Umpire
- Years active: 1997–1999 (NL), 2000–2015 (MLB)
- Employer(s): National League, Major League Baseball

Paul Warren Schrieber (June 30, 1966 – November 12, 2020) was an American professional baseball umpire, who worked in Major League Baseball from 1997 to 2015. His first game was on June 6, 1997. He wore uniform number 43. He umpired the MLB All-Star Game in 2000 and 2015 and the Division Series in 1999, 2000, 2001, and 2014.

== Career ==
Prior to his major league promotion, Schrieber umpired in the Northwest League (1990), California League (1991–92), Florida State League (1993), and the Southern League (1994–95). In his first major league game, he held an empty seat for his mother, who died from breast cancer.

According to a report in The Hardball Times, Schrieber had one of the smallest strike zones during the 2011 season.

== Personal life ==
He resided in Scottsdale, Arizona, and has two sons, Jack and Kevin. Schrieber was a second-generation professional umpire; his father umpired as high as Class AAA.

Schrieber graduated from Canada Junior College and attended Portland State University. Schrieber was a catcher on the baseball team at Portland State. Schrieber died in November 2020.

== See also ==
- List of Major League Baseball umpires (disambiguation)
