= 2007 Major League Baseball All-Star Game =

2007 American baseball competition

	1	2	3	4	5	6	7	8	9	R	H	E
American League	0	0	0	0	2	1	0	2	0	5	10	0
National League	1	0	0	0	0	1	0	0	2	4	9	1
- Date: July 10, 2007
- Venue: AT&T Park
- City: San Francisco, California
- Managers: Jim Leyland (DET); Tony La Russa (STL)
- MVP: Ichiro Suzuki (SEA)
- Attendance: 43,965
- Ceremonial first pitch: Willie Mays
- Television: Fox (United States); MLB International (International)
- TV announcers: Joe Buck and Tim McCarver (Fox); Dave O'Brien and Rick Sutcliffe (MLB International)
- Radio: ESPN
- Radio announcers: Dan Shulman and Dave Campbell

The 2007 Major League Baseball All-Star Game was the 78th midseason exhibition between the all-stars of the American League (AL) and the National League (NL), the two leagues comprising Major League Baseball. The game was held on July 10, 2007, at AT&T Park, the home of the NL's San Francisco Giants. It marked the third time that the Giants hosted the All Star Game since moving to San Francisco for the 1958 season. The 1961 and 1984 All Star Games were played at the Giants former home Candlestick Park, and the fourth overall in the Bay Area, with the Giants bay area rivals the Oakland Athletics hosting once back in 1987, and the second straight held in an NL ballpark.

The American League defeated the National League by a score of 5–4. Ichiro Suzuki won the MVP award for the game for hitting the first inside-the-park home run in All-Star history. As per the 2006 Collective Bargaining Agreement, the American League champion (which eventually came to be the Boston Red Sox) received home field advantage in the 2007 World Series. The victory was the 10th consecutive (excluding the 2002 tie) for the AL, and their 11-game unbeaten streak is only beaten by the NL's 11-game winning streak from 1972 to 1982 in All-Star history.

== Background ==
As with each All-Star Game since 1970, the eight starting position players (with no designated hitter due to playing in an NL stadium) of each league were elected by fan balloting. The remaining players were selected by a players' vote, each league's team manager, and a second fan balloting to add one more player to each roster. In all, 32 players were selected to each league's team, not including players who decline to play due to injuries or personal reasons.

The Giants were awarded the game on February 9, 2005. The game marked the first time since 1962 that one league hosted consecutive All-Star Games, after Pittsburgh, Pennsylvania, hosted the game in 2006.

The game was the fifth straight All-Star Game to decide home-field advantage in the World Series. The AL entered the game on a ten-game unbeaten streak (nine wins, with one tie in 2002). The NL was looking for their first win since the 1996 game in Philadelphia.

== Fan balloting ==
=== Starters ===
Balloting for the 2007 All-Star Game starters (excluding pitchers) began on April 27 and continued through June 28. The top vote-getters at each position and the top three among outfielders are named the starters for their respective leagues. The results were announced on July 1. About 18.5 million votes were cast by close to 12 million fans. Alex Rodriguez was the leading vote-getter with 3,890,515 votes, easily outpacing his Yankees teammate Derek Jeter by over 700,000 votes. Ken Griffey Jr., was the top vote-getter in the National League, with 2,986,818 votes.

=== Final roster spot ===
After the rosters were announced, a second round of fan voting, the Monster All-Star Final Vote, was commenced to determine the occupant of the final roster spot for each team. This round lasted until July 5. Chris Young and Hideki Okajima were elected to represent the National League and American League, respectively, in the All-Star Game as first time All-Stars. All ten players included in the balloting were pitchers, a first for the event.

Player	Team	Pos.	Experience (All Star/ Seasons)	Player	Team	Pos.	Experience (All Star/ Seasons)
American League				National League			
Hideki Okajima	BOS	RP	(0/1)	Chris Young	SD	SP	(0/4)
Jeremy Bonderman	DET	SP	(0/5)	Carlos Zambrano	CHC	SP	(2/7)
Pat Neshek	MIN	RP	(0/2)	Roy Oswalt	HOU	SP	(2/7)
Kelvim Escobar	LAA	SP	(0/11)	Brandon Webb	ARZ	SP	(1/5)
Roy Halladay	TOR	SP	(4/10)	Tom Gorzelanny	PIT	SP	(0/3)

== Rosters ==
Players in italics have since been inducted into the National Baseball Hall of Fame.

=== American League ===
Elected starters
Position	Player	Team	All-Star Games
C	Iván Rodríguez	Tigers	14
1B	David Ortiz	Red Sox	4
2B	Plácido Polanco	Tigers	1
3B	Alex Rodriguez	Yankees	11
SS	Derek Jeter	Yankees	8
OF	Vladimir Guerrero	Angels	8
OF	Magglio Ordóñez	Tigers	6
OF	Ichiro Suzuki	Mariners	7

Pitchers
Position	Player	Team	All-Star Games
P	Josh Beckett	Red Sox	1
P	Dan Haren	Athletics	1
P	Bobby Jenks ^{a}	White Sox	2
P	John Lackey ^{a}	Angels	1
P	Gil Meche ^{a}	Royals	1
P	Hideki Okajima ^{b} ^{a}	Red Sox	1
P	Jonathan Papelbon	Red Sox	2
P	J. J. Putz	Mariners	1
P	Francisco Rodríguez	Angels	2
P	CC Sabathia	Indians	3
P	Johan Santana	Twins	3
P	Justin Verlander	Tigers	1

Reserves
Position	Player	Team	All-Star Games
C	Víctor Martínez	Indians	2
C	Jorge Posada	Yankees	5
1B	Justin Morneau	Twins	1
2B	Brian Roberts	Orioles	2
3B	Mike Lowell	Red Sox	4
SS	Carlos Guillén	Tigers	2
SS	Michael Young ^{a}	Rangers	4
OF	Carl Crawford	Devil Rays	2
OF	Torii Hunter	Twins	2
OF	Manny Ramírez	Red Sox	11
OF	Alex Ríos	Blue Jays	2
OF	Grady Sizemore	Indians	2

=== National League ===
Elected starters
Position	Player	Team	All-Star Games
C	Russell Martin	Dodgers	1
1B	Prince Fielder	Brewers	1
2B	Chase Utley	Phillies	2
3B	David Wright	Mets	2
SS	José Reyes	Mets	2
OF	Carlos Beltrán	Mets	4
OF	Barry Bonds	Giants	14
OF	Ken Griffey Jr.	Reds	13

Pitchers
Position	Player	Team	All-Star Games
P	Francisco Cordero	Brewers	1
P	Brian Fuentes ^{c}	Rockies	3
P	Cole Hamels	Phillies	1
P	Trevor Hoffman	Padres	6
P	Roy Oswalt ^{a}	Astros	3
P	Jake Peavy	Padres	2
P	Brad Penny	Dodgers	2
P	Takashi Saito	Dodgers	1
P	Ben Sheets	Brewers	3
P	John Smoltz ^{d}	Braves	8
P	José Valverde ^{a}	Diamondbacks	1
P	Billy Wagner	Mets	5
P	Brandon Webb ^{a}	Diamondbacks	2
P	Chris Young ^{b}	Padres	1

Reserves
Position	Player	Team	All-Star Games
C	Brian McCann	Braves	2
1B	Derrek Lee	Cubs	2
1B	Albert Pujols ^{a}	Cardinals	6
1B	Dmitri Young	Nationals	2
2B	Orlando Hudson	Diamondbacks	1
2B	Freddy Sanchez	Pirates	2
3B	Miguel Cabrera	Marlins	4
SS	J. J. Hardy	Brewers	1
OF	Matt Holliday	Rockies	2
OF	Carlos Lee	Astros	3
OF	Aaron Rowand	Phillies	1
OF	Alfonso Soriano	Cubs	6

^a These players did not see action in the game.
^b Voted onto the roster through the All-Star Final Vote.
^c Unable to play due to injury. Brandon Webb took his roster spot.
^d Unable to play due to injury. Roy Oswalt took his roster spot.

== Managers ==
National League: Tony La Russa
American League: Jim Leyland

== Game ==
O Canada was played by members of the San Francisco Symphony. The Star-Spangled Banner was sung by Chris Isaak. Before the game, there was a tribute to former San Francisco Giants slugger Willie Mays. Mays threw the ceremonial first pitch to New York Mets shortstop José Reyes. Paula Cole sang God Bless America during the seventh-inning stretch. The first pitch was thrown by the National League's starter, Jake Peavy at 8:54 EDT The game was completed in 3 hours, 6 minutes under an overcast sky and a gametime temperature of 68 °F (20 °C).

=== Umpires ===
Umpires for the game were announced on June 14. Bruce Froemming, the most tenured current umpire in Major League Baseball, was named crew chief for the game. It was also revealed that day that Froemming would retire following the 2007 season.

Position	Umpire	MLB seasons
Home Plate	Bruce Froemming	37
First Base	Charlie Reliford	18
Second Base	Mike Winters	18
Third Base	Kerwin Danley	10
Left Field	Ted Barrett	9
Right Field	Bill Miller	9

=== Starting lineups ===
American League				National League			
Order	Player	Team	Position	Order	Player	Team	Position
1	Ichiro Suzuki	Mariners	CF	1	José Reyes	Mets	SS
2	Derek Jeter	Yankees	SS	2	Barry Bonds	Giants	LF
3	David Ortiz	Red Sox	1B	3	Carlos Beltrán	Mets	CF
4	Alex Rodriguez	Yankees	3B	4	Ken Griffey Jr.	Reds	RF
5	Vladimir Guerrero	Angels	RF	5	David Wright	Mets	3B
6	Magglio Ordóñez	Tigers	LF	6	Prince Fielder	Brewers	1B
7	Iván Rodríguez	Tigers	C	7	Russell Martin	Dodgers	C
8	Plácido Polanco	Tigers	2B	8	Chase Utley	Phillies	2B
9	Dan Haren	Athletics	P	9	Jake Peavy	Padres	P

=== Game summary ===
Tuesday, July 10, 2007 5:54 pm (PDT) at AT&T Park in San Francisco, California
Team	1	2	3	4	5	6	7	8	9	R	H	E
American League	0	0	0	0	2	1	0	2	0	5	10	0
National League	1	0	0	0	0	1	0	0	2	4	9	1
Starting pitchers: AL: Dan Haren; NL: Jake Peavy; WP: Josh Beckett (1–0) LP: Chris Young (0–1) Sv: Francisco Rodríguez (1); Home runs: AL: Ichiro Suzuki (1), Carl Crawford (1), Víctor Martínez (1); NL: Alfonso Soriano (1)

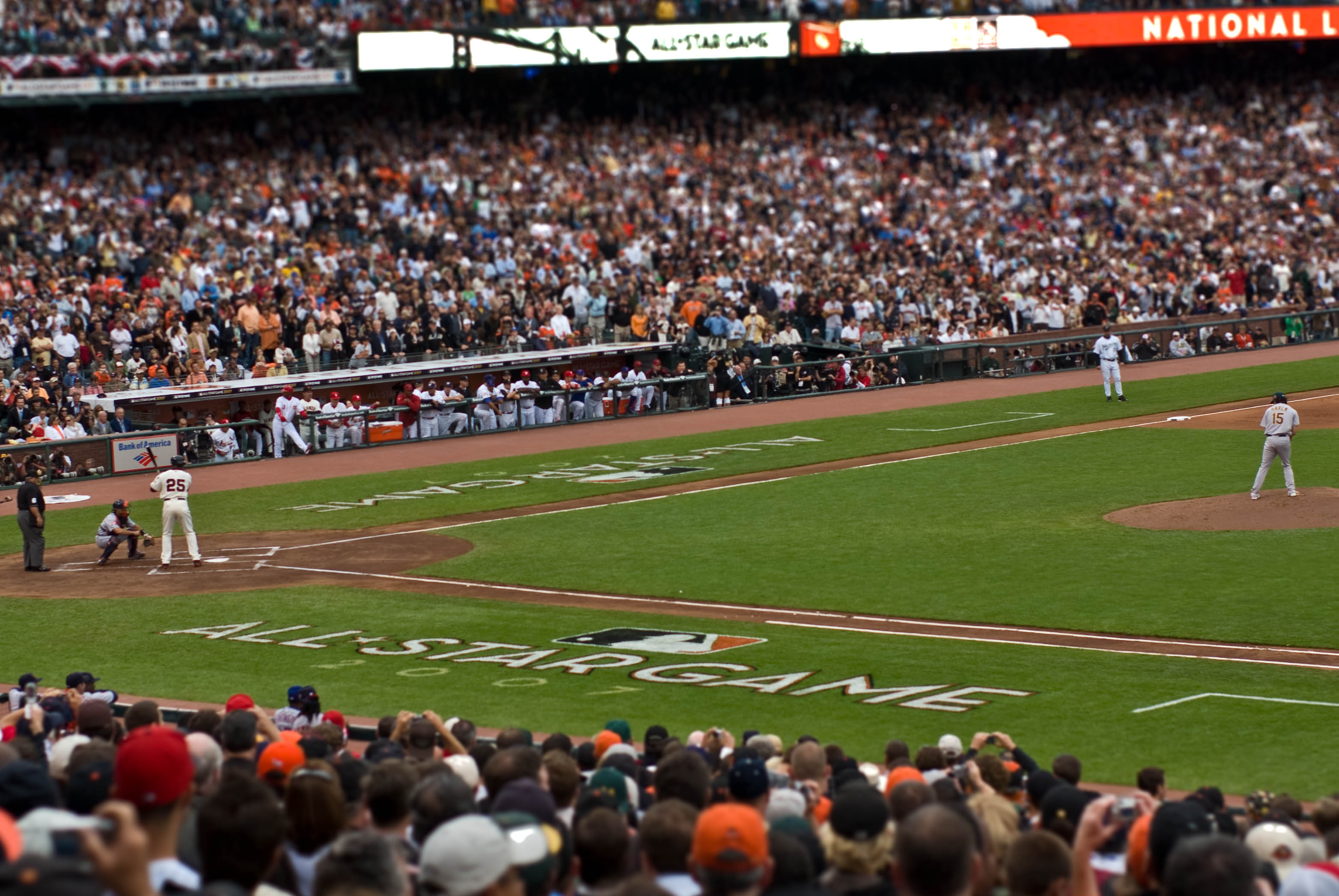
Barry Bonds (batter) vs Dan Haren (pitcher)

The National League got things started in the bottom of the first when José Reyes led off with a base hit off American League starter Dan Haren and proceeded to steal second. He scored on an RBI single by Ken Griffey Jr. to give the NL a 1–0 lead. Barry Bonds nearly gave his hometown fans something to cheer for in the bottom of the third when, with Reyes on second, he lofted a high fly ball to left field, but it was snared at the warning track by Magglio Ordóñez. The AL nearly tied the game in the fourth when Alex Rodriguez attempted to score on a two-out single by Iván Rodríguez. However, the throw to home plate by Griffey allowed Russell Martin to tag Rodriguez out at the plate to end the inning. The AL would score one inning later when, after Chris Young issued a leadoff walk to Brian Roberts, Ichiro Suzuki hit a long fly ball off the right field wall. Instead of caroming straight to Griffey, the ball took an unusual bounce off a sign and ricocheted to Griffey's right. This allowed Ichiro to score on what is still the only inside-the-park home run in All-Star Game history. The homer gave the AL a 2–1 lead and resulted in Ichiro's MVP win.

The lead would be augmented in the sixth when Carl Crawford hit a line drive that just cleared the right field wall for a home run. Though it appeared a fan may have reached over the wall to catch it, NL manager Tony La Russa did not challenge the umpires' call. The NL got a run back in the bottom of the inning when Carlos Beltrán led off with a triple and scored on a sacrifice fly by Griffey. The AL added some insurance runs in the eighth when Víctor Martínez hit a two-run home run just inside the left field foul pole to give the AL a 5–2 lead.

The American League's closers then entered the game, with Jonathan Papelbon pitching a scoreless bottom of the eighth. In the ninth, J. J. Putz tried to earn the save and began by inducing a weak pop-up and striking out Brian McCann. Pinch-hitter Dmitri Young rolled a ground ball deep in the hole to Brian Roberts, but he could not come up with it. Alfonso Soriano followed with a two-run home run to right field to cut the NL's deficit to one. After Putz walked J. J. Hardy, AL manager Jim Leyland replaced him with Francisco Rodríguez. However, Rodriguez had trouble consistently locating his pitches and walked Derrek Lee on a check-swing 3–2 pitch and then Orlando Hudson to load the bases. In a move that drew criticism, La Russa elected not to pinch-hit his last player on the bench, Albert Pujols, and instead let Aaron Rowand hit. Rowand lofted a fly ball to right field that was caught by Alex Ríos to close the game, earning the American League their tenth consecutive victory.

== Home Run Derby ==
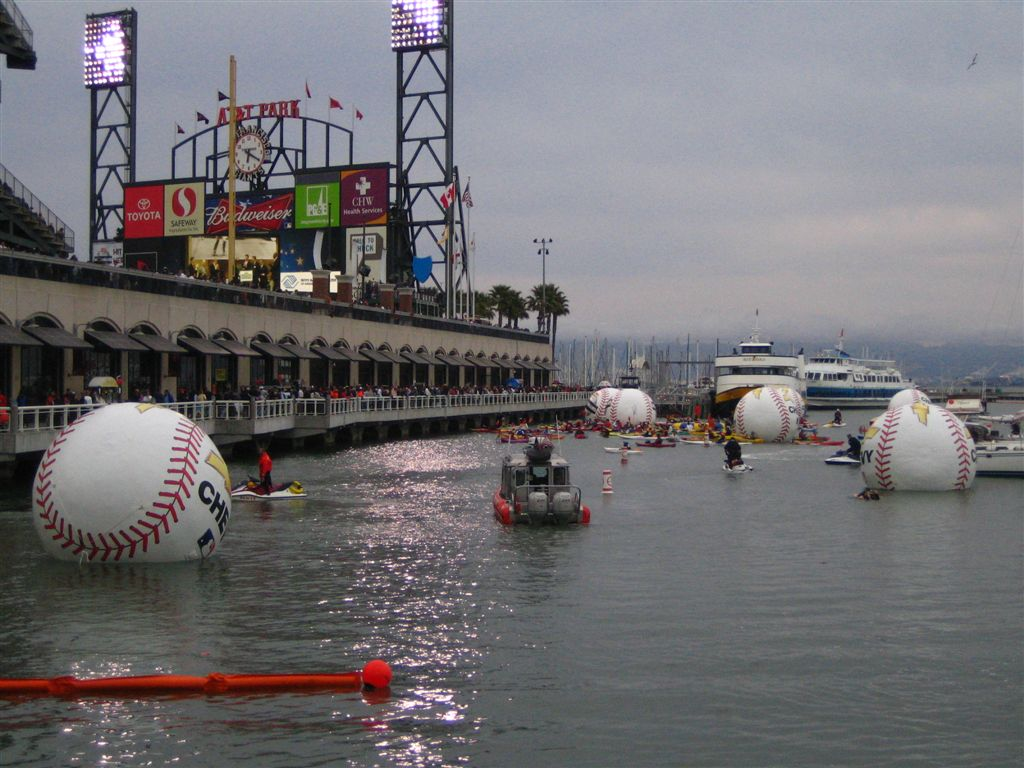
McCovey Cove

The State Farm Home Run Derby was held the night before the All-Star Game, July 9, and broadcast on ESPN. Four players from each league competed to hit as many home runs as they could in each round to advance and eventually win the contest. This year, a five-swing swing-off would be used to break ties occurring in any round. This became necessary when Albert Pujols and Justin Morneau tied for fourth in the first round. The champion of last year's Derby, Ryan Howard of the Philadelphia Phillies, competed even though he was not named to the NL All-Star roster.

In the finals, Vladimir Guerrero of the Los Angeles Angels of Anaheim defeated Alex Ríos of the Toronto Blue Jays by a score of 3–2. Guerrero hit 17 home runs in all, second only to Ríos' 19. Guerrero also hit the longest blast of the competition, a 503-foot (153 m) drive to left field that just missed hitting a giant replica glove and baseball set up on the concourse beyond the left field bleachers.

AT&T Park is distinguished by having the San Francisco Bay beyond its right field bleachers. The body of water located adjacent to the ballpark is known as McCovey Cove, named for legendary Giants slugger Willie McCovey. McCovey Cove is known for having many fans sitting in the water in kayaks and boats hoping to retrieve a long home run ball hit there. Though dozens of fans waited in the cove during the Derby, no home runs were actually hit into the water, either on the fly or off the promenade next to the right field seats, though, two foul balls hit by Justin Morneau and Prince Fielder did reach the water. This was largely due to the three left-handed competitors all exiting in the first round, as well as wind currents blowing toward left field. Prior to the All-Star break, a total of 58 home runs were hit into the cove on the fly during the park's history.

Gold balls were utilized whenever any player had one out remaining during his round. Any home runs hit with the balls meant Major League Baseball and State Farm would pledge to donate money to the Boys & Girls Clubs of America. Due to the change in sponsors from Century 21 to State Farm, each ball's value was reduced to US$17,000 to reflect the 17,000 State Farm agents in the United States and Canada. In all, twelve gold ball home runs were hit, which, along with a $50,000 "bonus" constituted $254,000 raised for charity.

AT&T Park, San Francisco—A.L. 42, N.L. 32
Player	Team	Round 1	Round 2	Subtotal	Finals	Total
(Dominican Republic) Vladimir Guerrero	Los Angeles (AL)	5	9	14	3 ^{a}	17
Alex Ríos	Toronto	5	12	17	2	19
Matt Holliday	Colorado	5	8	13	–	13
Albert Pujols	St. Louis	4 ^{b}	9	13	–	13
Justin Morneau	Minnesota	4	–	4	–	4
Prince Fielder	Milwaukee	3	–	3	–	3
Ryan Howard	Philadelphia	3	–	3	–	3
Magglio Ordóñez	Detroit	2	–	2	–	2

^a Recorded only seven of ten outs before hitting winning home run.
^b Advanced after defeating Morneau 2–1 in a swing-off.

== Futures Game ==
The 2007 XM All-Star Futures Game took place on July 8, showcasing the top minor league prospects from all thirty teams' farm systems. The contest is seven innings regardless of the score with pitchers limited to no more than one inning of work. The World team defeated the United States by a score of 7–2. Chin-Lung Hu of the Los Angeles Dodgers organization won the Larry Doby MVP award after driving in two runs on a single and double, plus a stolen base and a run.

Team	1	2	3	4	5	6	7	R	H	E
World	2	0	1	1	0	1	2	7	8	0
United States	0	0	1	0	1	0	0	2	5	1
WP: Rick van den Hurk (1–0) LP: Jeff Niemann (0–1); Home runs: Wor: Joey Votto (1), James Van Ostrand (1); USA: Justin Upton (1), John Whittleman (1)
