= 1999 National League Division Series =

American baseball games

Teams
Team (Wins)		Manager	Season
Atlanta Braves (3)		Bobby Cox	103–59 (.636), GA: 6 1/2
Houston Astros (1)		Larry Dierker	97–65 (.599), GA: 1 1/2
- Dates: October 5–9
- Television: ESPN
- TV announcers: Jon Miller, Rick Sutcliffe (Games 1, 3–4), and Joe Morgan (Game 2)
- Radio: ESPN
- Radio announcers: Jim Durham and Mark Grace
- Umpires: Games 1–2: Mike Winters, Charlie Williams, Rich Rieker, Gerry Davis, Bruce Froemming, Jerry Meals; Games 3–4: Brian Gorman, Wally Bell, Mark Hirschbeck, Dana DeMuth, Randy Marsh, Paul Schrieber

Teams
Team (Wins)		Manager	Season
New York Mets (3)		Bobby Valentine	97–66 (.595), GB: 6 1/2
Arizona Diamondbacks (1)		Buck Showalter	100–62 (.617), GA: 14
- Dates: October 5–9
- Television: ESPN (Games 1–2); NBC (Game 3); ESPN2 (Game 4)
- TV announcers: Chris Berman, Ray Knight, and Buck Martinez (Games 1–2, 4); Bob Costas and Joe Morgan (Game 3)
- Radio: ESPN
- Radio announcers: Charley Steiner and Dusty Baker
- Umpires: Games 1–2: Brian Gorman, Wally Bell, Mark Hirschbeck, Dana DeMuth, Randy Marsh, Paul Schrieber; Games 3–4: Mike Winters, Charlie Williams, Rich Rieker, Gerry Davis, Bruce Froemming, Jerry Meals

The 1999 National League Division Series (NLDS), consisted of two best-of-five playoff series on the National League side in Major League Baseball’s 1999 postseason, began on Tuesday, October 5, and ended on Saturday, October 9, with the champions of the three NL divisions—along with a "wild card" team—participating in two series.

Under MLB's playoff format, no two teams from the same division were matched up in the Division Series, regardless of whether their records would normally indicate such a matchup. Home field advantage went to the team with the better regular-season record with the exception of the wild card team, which defers home field advantage regardless of record. The matchups were:

- (1) Atlanta Braves (NL East champions) vs. (3) Houston Astros (NL Central champions): Braves won the series, 3–1.
- (2) Arizona Diamondbacks (NL West champions) vs. (4) New York Mets (Wild Card qualifier): Mets won the series, 3–1.

The higher seeded team in each series hosts Games 1, 2, and 5 (if necessary), and the lower seeded team hosts Games 3 and 4 (if necessary).

The Braves and Mets went on to meet in the NL Championship Series (NLCS). The Braves became the National League champion, and were defeated by the American League champion New York Yankees in the 1999 World Series.

== Matchups ==
=== Atlanta Braves vs. Houston Astros ===
Atlanta won the series, 3–1.

Game	Date	Score	Location	Time	Attendance
1	October 5	Houston Astros – 6, Atlanta Braves – 1	Turner Field	3:03	39,119
2	October 6	Houston Astros – 1, Atlanta Braves – 5	Turner Field	2:13	41,913
3	October 8	Atlanta Braves – 5, Houston Astros – 3 (12)	Astrodome	4:19	48,625
4	October 9	Atlanta Braves – 7, Houston Astros – 5	Astrodome	3:12	48,553

=== Arizona Diamondbacks vs. New York Mets ===
New York won the series, 3–1.

Game	Date	Score	Location	Time	Attendance
1	October 5	New York Mets – 8, Arizona Diamondbacks – 4	Bank One Ballpark	2:53	49,584
2	October 6	New York Mets – 1, Arizona Diamondbacks – 7	Bank One Ballpark	3:13	49,328
3	October 8	Arizona Diamondbacks – 2, New York Mets – 9	Shea Stadium	3:05	56,180
4	October 9	Arizona Diamondbacks – 3, New York Mets – 4 (10)	Shea Stadium	3:23	56,177

== Atlanta vs. Houston ==
=== Game 1 ===
October 5, 1999 4:09 pm (EDT) at Turner Field in Atlanta, Georgia 71 °F (22 °C), sunny
Team	1	2	3	4	5	6	7	8	9	R	H	E
Houston	0	1	0	0	0	1	0	0	4	6	13	0
Atlanta	0	0	0	0	1	0	0	0	0	1	7	0
WP: Shane Reynolds (1–0) LP: Greg Maddux (0–1); Home runs: HOU: Daryle Ward (1), Ken Caminiti (1); ATL: None; Attendance: 39,119; Boxscore

A pitcher's duel between Shane Reynolds and Greg Maddux highlighted Game 1. The Astros struck first in the top of the second when Tony Eusebio singled in Carl Everett. Gerald Williams would tie the game in the bottom of the fifth, singling home Jose Hernández. Daryle Ward would give the Astros the lead on a home run in the top of the sixth. The score would remain the same until the ninth. With Mike Remlinger pitching for Atlanta, Houston loaded the bases with one out as Carl Everett's sacrifice fly put them up 3–1, then a three-run homer by Ken Caminiti capped the inning's scoring. The Braves were retired 1–2–3 in the bottom versus Billy Wagner as the Astros took a 1–0 series lead. From 1995–2020, this was the only Division Series in which the Braves won after losing either Game 1 or 2 of the series. Not until 2021, did the Braves repeat the feat after losing Game 1 and subsequently winning the next three games.

=== Game 2 ===
October 6, 1999 4:09 pm (EDT) at Turner Field in Atlanta, Georgia 70 °F (21 °C), cloudy
Team	1	2	3	4	5	6	7	8	9	R	H	E
Houston	0	1	0	0	0	0	0	0	0	1	1	1
Atlanta	1	0	0	0	0	1	3	0	X	5	11	1
WP: Kevin Millwood (1–0) LP: José Lima (0–1); Home runs: HOU: Ken Caminiti (2); ATL: None; Attendance: 41,913; Boxscore

A brilliant performance by Kevin Millwood stole the show. Had it not been for Ken Caminiti's home run in the second and an error, Millwood would have pitched a perfect game. The Braves would take Game 2 behind his masterful performance. Atlanta drew first blood when Gerald Williams singled to lead off the first off José Lima, stole second, moved to second on a groundout, and scored on Brian Jordan's single. With the game tied at 1, Ryan Klesko singled with one out in the sixth, moved to third on a double and scored on Eddie Perez's sacrifice fly to put Atlanta up 2–1. Next inning, Bret Boone doubled with one out, moving to third on an error and after Chipper Jones was intentionally walked, Brian Jordan's sacrifice fly scored Boone and moved Jones to second. Scott Elarton relieved Lima and allowed an RBI single to Klesko, Two wild pitches moved him to third before he scored on Andruw Jones's RBI single. The Braves' 5–1 win tied the series heading to Houston.

=== Game 3 ===
October 8, 1999 4:09 pm (CDT) at Astrodome in Houston, Texas 72 °F (22 °C), dome
Team	1	2	3	4	5	6	7	8	9	10	11	12	R	H	E
Atlanta	0	0	0	0	0	3	0	0	0	0	0	2	5	12	0
Houston	2	0	0	0	0	0	1	0	0	0	0	0	3	9	2
WP: John Rocker (1–0) LP: Jay Powell (0–1) Sv: Kevin Millwood (1); Home runs: ATL: Brian Jordan (1); HOU: None; Attendance: 48,625; Boxscore

The turning point of the series occurred in Game 3. Tom Glavine faced Mike Hampton, who were both coming off career years. The Astros struck first when Craig Biggio led off the bottom of the first with a single, moved to second on a groundout and after a walk to Jeff Bagwell, scored on Ken Caminiti's RBI single. A walk loaded the bases before another walk to Tony Eusebio scored Bagwell made it 2–0 Astros. The Braves responded with a towering three-run home run by Brian Jordan in the sixth. The Astros tied the game in the seventh when Russ Johnson doubled off Terry Mulholland and scored on Bill Spiers's single off Mike Remlinger. In the bottom of the tenth, with the bases loaded and nobody out, John Rocker was called in to save the game. There was no margin for error. An unbelievable play by Walt Weiss prevented Ken Caminiti from scoring off Tony Eusebio's hit up the middle. Weiss dived and stopped the ball and threw home. Another forceout at the plate made it two outs. Ricky Gutiérrez struck out to end the threat. Jordan got them the win in the top of the 12th with a two-run double off Jay Powell after back-to-back one-out singles. Kevin Millwood, who threw 9 innings the game before, retired the Astros in order in the bottom of the inning to earn the save and put the Braves one game away from the NLCS.

=== Game 4 ===
October 9, 1999 1:09 pm (CDT) at Astrodome in Houston, Texas 72 °F (22 °C), dome
Team	1	2	3	4	5	6	7	8	9	R	H	E
Atlanta	1	0	1	0	0	5	0	0	0	7	15	1
Houston	0	0	0	0	0	0	1	4	0	5	8	1
WP: John Smoltz (1–0) LP: Shane Reynolds (1–1) Sv: John Rocker (1); Home runs: ATL: None; HOU: Tony Eusebio (1), Ken Caminiti (3); Attendance: 48,553; Boxscore

Shane Reynolds was once again called on to save the Astros, but facing him this time would be John Smoltz. Chipper Jones put the Braves on the board in the top of the first with a sacrifice fly after a leadoff double by Gerald Williams. A Bret Boone single drove in the second Atlanta run in the third after a leadoff double by Smoltz, who moved to third on a groundout. The Braves piled on in the sixth. After back-to-back leadoff singles, Chris Holt relieved Reynolds and allowed an RBI single to Andruw Jones and two-run single Eddie Perez. After Walt Weiss singled, Scott Elarton relieved Holt and after a sacrifice bunt, Williams's RBI single made it 7–0 Braves. Tony Eusebio homered to cut the lead to six in the seventh. In the eighth, after a hit-by-pitch and single, a three-run home run by Ken Caminiti brought the Astros to within three runs. Terry Mulholland relieved Smoltz and after a one-out single, Tim Bogar's RBI double cut the lead to two with five outs to go. John Rocker halted the Houston rally and brought the Braves back to the NLCS for the eighth straight year and history of the Astrodome to a close.

=== Composite box ===
1999 NLDS (3–1): Atlanta Braves over Houston Astros

Team	1	2	3	4	5	6	7	8	9	10	11	12	R	H	E
Atlanta Braves	2	0	1	0	1	9	3	0	0	0	0	2	18	45	2
Houston Astros	2	2	0	0	0	1	2	4	4	0	0	0	15	31	4
Total attendance: 178,210 Average attendance: 44,553

== Arizona vs. New York ==
=== Game 1 ===
October 5, 1999 8:09 pm (MST) at Bank One Ballpark in Phoenix, Arizona 93 °F (34 °C), roof open; clear
Team	1	2	3	4	5	6	7	8	9	R	H	E
New York	1	0	2	1	0	0	0	0	4	8	10	0
Arizona	0	0	1	1	0	2	0	0	0	4	7	0
WP: Turk Wendell (1–0) LP: Randy Johnson (0–1); Home runs: NYM: Edgardo Alfonzo 2 (2), John Olerud (1); AZ: Erubiel Durazo (1), Luis Gonzalez (1); Attendance: 49,584; Boxscore

The Arizona Diamondbacks won the National League Western Division in the franchise's second year. They were managed by Buck Showalter and finished the season with 100 wins. The New York Mets clinched the Wild Card in a one-game winner-take-all playoff against the Cincinnati Reds and qualified for the playoffs for the first time since losing the 1988 National League Championship Series against the Los Angeles Dodgers.

Masato Yoshii faced Randy Johnson in Game 1. Edgardo Alfonzo got the scoring started for the Mets in the top of the first with a one-out home run. Then a two-run home run by John Olerud after a walk made it 3–0 Mets in the third. Jay Bell's sacrifice fly after a one-out triple made it 3–1 in the bottom of the third, but Rey Ordóñez's sacrifice bunt with runners on first and third made it 4–1 Mets in the fourth. Erubiel Durazo's home run made it 4–2 in the bottom of the fourth. Then a two-run home run by Luis Gonzalez tied the game at four and ended Yoshii's night. The game remained tied into the ninth inning. A controversial move by manager Showalter allowed Johnson to stay in the game. Two singles and a walk loaded the bases and knocked Johnson out of the game. He was relieved by Bobby Chouinard. After the second out, Alfonzo hit a grand slam to put the Mets out in front 8–4. Armando Benítez shut the D'Backs down 1–2–3 in the bottom half to finish the game.

=== Game 2 ===
October 6, 1999 8:09 pm (MST) at Bank One Ballpark in Phoenix, Arizona 83 °F (28 °C), roof open; clear
Team	1	2	3	4	5	6	7	8	9	R	H	E
New York	0	0	1	0	0	0	0	0	0	1	5	0
Arizona	0	0	3	0	2	0	2	0	X	7	9	1
WP: Todd Stottlemyre (1–0) LP: Kenny Rogers (0–1); Attendance: 49,328; Boxscore

Kenny Rogers took on postseason veteran Todd Stottlemyre, who was hoping to even the series before moving to New York. Both pitchers were on even terms into the third inning. The Mets got on the board thanks to an RBI groundout by John Olerud in the third after Rickey Henderson hit a leadoff single, stole second and moved to third on a groundout. However, that was all the Mets got against Stottlemyre, who pitched 6 1/3 masterful innings. The Diamondbacks loaded the bases against Rogers in the bottom of the third after two outs on two singles and a hit-by-pitch. Then, Greg Colbrunn walked to tie the game at one. Steve Finley gave the Diamondbacks their first-ever postseason lead with a two-run single to right field. Then Finley had two more RBIs with a double to center in the fifth off Pat Mahomes. In the seventh, the Diamondbacks loaded the bases on a walk, double and hit-by-pitch off Octavio Dotel when Finley walked to force in a run, then Turner Ward's RBI groundout off John Franco made it 7–1 Diamondbacks. The score would stand as the D'Backs evened the series at a game apiece.

=== Game 3 ===
October 8, 1999 8:10 pm (EDT) at Shea Stadium in Queens, New York 58 °F (14 °C), clear
Team	1	2	3	4	5	6	7	8	9	R	H	E
Arizona	0	0	0	0	2	0	0	0	0	2	5	3
New York	0	1	2	0	0	6	0	0	X	9	11	0
WP: Rick Reed (1–0) LP: Omar Daal (0–1); Home runs: AZ: Turner Ward (1); NYM: None; Attendance: 56,180; Boxscore

In Game 3, Omar Daal faced Rick Reed. The Diamondbacks blew opportunities in the first two innings and that would cost them as the Mets would take a 1–0 lead on Rey Ordóñez's RBI single that scored Benny Agbayani. In the third, Edgardo Alfonzo doubled with one out and scored on John Olerud's single. A single moved him to third before he scored on Robin Ventura's groundout aided by an error by Andy Fox to give the Mets a 3–0 edge. The Diamondbacks made it a one-run game when Kelly Stinnett doubled and pinch hitter Turner Ward, batting for Daal, hit a two-run homer in the fifth. The Mets blew the game open in the sixth against the Diamondback bullpen. Darren Holmes walked two and Rickey Henderson's one-out RBI single made it 4–2 Mets. After an intentional walk, Dan Plesac relieved Darren Holmes and allowed a two-run single to Orelud and RBI single to Roger Cedeño. After Cedeno stole second and Ventura grounded out, Darryl Hamilton's two-run single scored both Olerud and Cedeno made it 9–2 Mets. Turk Wendell, John Franco, and Orel Hershiser held the Diamondbacks scoreless over the last three innings and the Mets were one win away from the NLCS.

=== Game 4 ===
October 9, 1999 1:09 pm (EDT) at Shea Stadium in Queens, New York 65 °F (18 °C), cloudy
Team	1	2	3	4	5	6	7	8	9	10	R	H	E
Arizona	0	0	0	0	1	0	0	2	0	0	3	5	1
New York	0	0	0	1	0	1	0	1	0	1	4	8	0
WP: John Franco (1–0) LP: Matt Mantei (0–1); Home runs: AZ: Greg Colbrunn (1); NYM: Edgardo Alfonzo (3), Todd Pratt (1); Attendance: 56,177; Boxscore

In the potential clinching Game 4, Brian Anderson faced Al Leiter. The game would remain scoreless until the bottom of the fourth, when Edgardo Alfonzo's leadoff home run made it 1–0 Mets, but Greg Colbrunn homered to tie the game in the fifth. Then Agbayani's RBI double with two on made it 2–1 Mets. In the eight, Leiter allowed a two-out walk and subsequent single before Jay Bell's two-run double off Armando Benítez gave the Diamondbacks the lead, but the Mets tied the game in the bottom half when Alfonzo drew a leadoff walk off Gregg Olson, moved to third on an error, and scored on a sacrifice fly by Roger Cedeño off Greg Swindell. During the bottom of the 8th inning, Mets 3rd base coach Cookie Rojas was ejected for arguing a foul ball hit by Darryl Hamilton, and would be suspended for 5 games for shoving the left field umpire Charlie Williams. As the game moved to extra innings, John Franco came on in relief in the tenth and shut the Diamondbacks down 1–2–3. The Mets would win the series when Todd Pratt hit a home run to center field off Matt Mantei. Steve Finley failed to catch the ball after making a leap to the wall.

Buck Showalter would eventually be fired in 2000 in Arizona as the team underperformed. Like what happened in 1995-1996 New York with the Yankees, the D'Backs won the World Series the year after he was fired in 2001. Buck managed the Rangers from 2003-2006 and the Orioles from 2010-2018 before landing with the Mets in 2022.

=== Composite box ===
1999 NLDS (3–1): New York Mets over Arizona Diamondbacks

Team	1	2	3	4	5	6	7	8	9	10	R	H	E
New York Mets	1	1	5	2	0	7	0	1	4	1	22	34	0
Arizona Diamondbacks	0	0	4	1	5	2	2	2	0	0	16	26	5
Total attendance: 211,269 Average attendance: 52,817
