= Mark Hirschbeck =

American baseball umpire (born 1960)

- Born: September 22, 1960 (age 66); Bridgeport, Connecticut, U.S.

debut
- 1987

Last appearance
- April 15, 2003

Career highlights and awards
- Special Assignments: All Star Games (1993, 2000); Division Series (1997, 1999, 2001 ALDS, 2002); League Championship Series (1996, 2000 American League Championship Series); World Series (1998, 2001)

Mark Hirschbeck (born September 22, 1960) is an American former umpire in Major League Baseball who worked in the National League from 1987 to 1999, and both Major Leagues from 2000 until his retirement in 2003.

== Career ==
He wore uniform number 4 (previously worn by former NL umpire Satch Davidson) throughout his NL career, but changed to 20 when the umpiring staffs unified in 2000. His brother John is also a former major league umpire, making the Hirschbecks the first pair of brothers to umpire in the Major Leagues at the same time. (Brothers Tim and Bill Welke became the second such pair.)

Mark Hirschbeck's assignments included the 1997, 1999 and 2002 National League Division Series, the 2001 American League Division Series, the 1996 NLCS, the 2000 ALCS, and the 1998 and 2001 World Series. Hirschbeck also officiated the 1993 and 2000 All-Star Games.

== Health problems and retirement ==
Hirschbeck was forced to retire seven games into the 2003 season after it was discovered that he needed a hip replacement. Although Hirschbeck originally hoped to return to umpiring after he recovered from his surgery, his ceramic implant cracked six weeks after the operation. About two months later, a staph infection formed in Hirschbeck's hip and he was unable to return to baseball. Hirschbeck later sued Wright Medical Technology, makers of the ceramic prosthetic, as well as the doctor who performed the surgery. Hirschbeck settled out of court with both the surgeon and the medical device company.

== Post-umpiring career ==
In 2012, Hirschbeck opened the Shelton, Connecticut restaurant, Hirschbeck's Sports Bar & Grille, which later closed in 2015.

== See also ==
- List of Major League Baseball umpires (disambiguation)
