= Kerwin Danley =

American baseball umpire (born 1961)

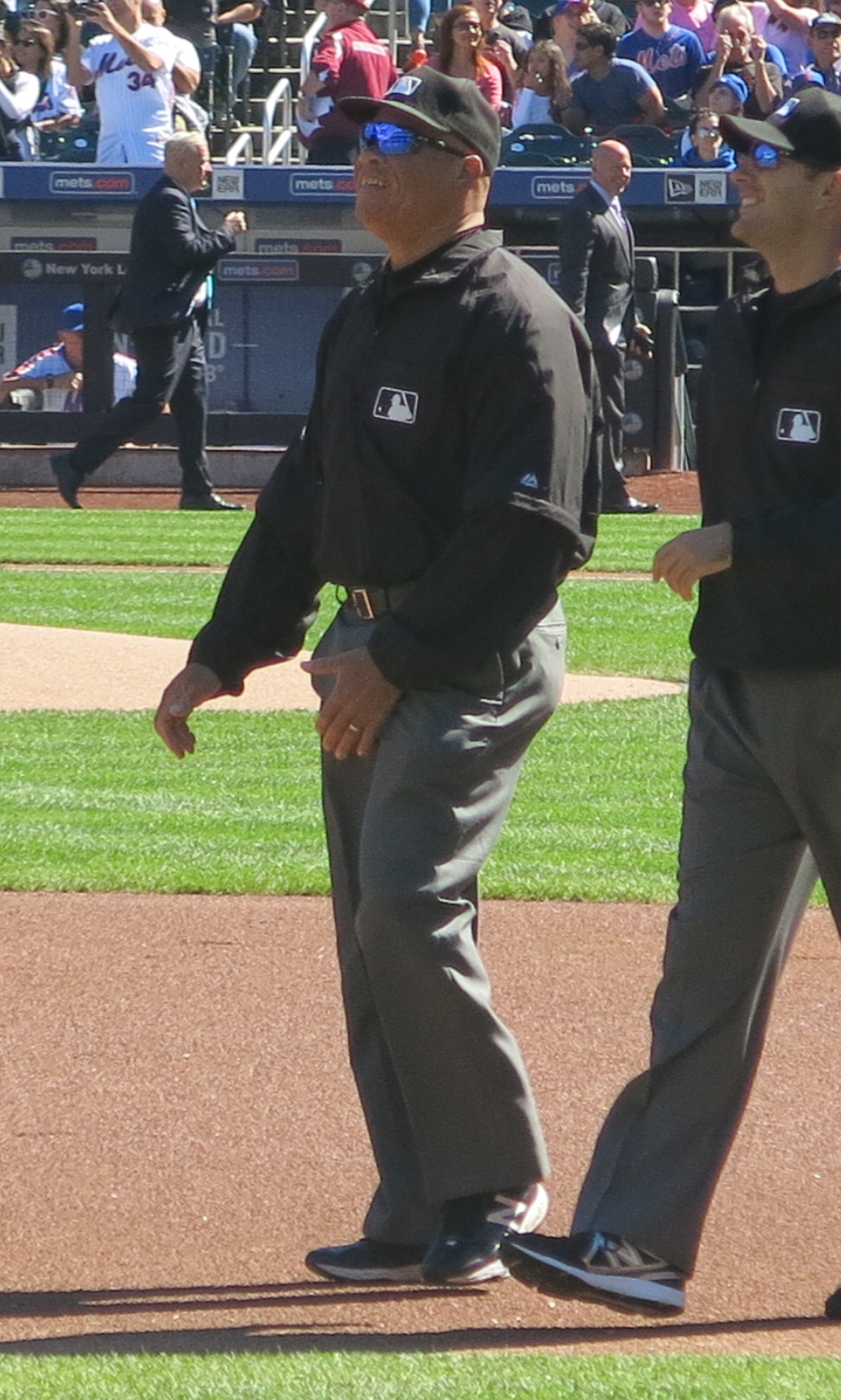
- Danley in 2016
- Born: May 25, 1961 (age 65); Los Angeles, California, U.S.

debut
- June 12, 1992

Last appearance
- August 29, 2021

Career highlights and awards
- Special Assignments: All-Star Game (2007, 2016); National League Wild Card Games (2019); American League Division Series (2000, 2001, 2004, 2006, 2008, 2011); National League Division Series (2018); American League Championship Series (2007, 2019); World Series (2008, 2018)

Kerwin Joseph Danley (born May 25, 1961) is an American former umpire in Major League Baseball who worked in the National League (NL) from 1992 to 1999 and throughout both leagues from 2000 to 2021. He wore uniform number 44. He was promoted to crew chief for the 2020 season, becoming the first full time African-American crew chief. Danley has umpired in the 2008 and 2018 World Series and the 2007 and 2016 Major League Baseball All-Star Games. He is married to Marisa Danley.

== College baseball ==
Danley played baseball at San Diego State University, where he was teammates with pitcher and later MLB coach and manager Bud Black and future Baseball Hall of Fame legend Tony Gwynn, before beginning his umpiring career. He was a First Team All-American in 1983.

== Umpire career ==
Danley was the first base umpire for the game between the San Francisco Giants and the San Diego Padres on August 4, 2007. In the top of the second inning at San Diego, Barry Bonds of the Giants hit his 755th career home run off starter Clay Hensley, tying Hank Aaron for first all-time.

Danley was on the field at first base on August 6, 1999, when former San Diego State teammate Tony Gwynn collected his 3,000th career hit.

Danley was the first base umpire for Miami Marlins pitcher Edinson Vólquez's no-hitter against the Arizona Diamondbacks on June 3, 2017.

On February 28, 2020, Danley was promoted to crew chief, making him the first African-American umpire promoted to crew chief at the Major League level.

He retired before the 2022 season.

=== Injuries ===
Danley has a significant history of head trauma.

In 2008, Danley was hit in the mask and knocked unconscious by a 96-mph fastball at Dodger Stadium. He was carried off the field on a stretcher.

On April 21, 2009, Danley was again stretchered off the field after being hit in the mask with a broken bat.

On June 4, 2013, Danley was hit in the mask by a pitch that bounced in the dirt in Cincinnati and left the game. He was replaced behind home plate by Lance Barksdale.

On May 12, 2015, Danley was hit in the mask by a 94-mph foul ball in Arizona and left the game. He was replaced behind home plate by Gabe Morales.

On April 7, 2016, Danley was hit in the mask by a 98-mph fastball in Miami but remained in the game.

On July 9, 2017, Danley was hit in the mask by a 94-mph foul ball in Dodger Stadium and left the game. He was replaced behind home plate by Adam Hamari.

On April 27, 2021, Danley was hit in the mask by a foul ball in San Francisco and left the game. He was replaced behind home plate by Ryan Additon.

== See also ==
- List of Major League Baseball umpires (disambiguation)
