= Mike Winters (umpire) =

American baseball umpire (born 1958)

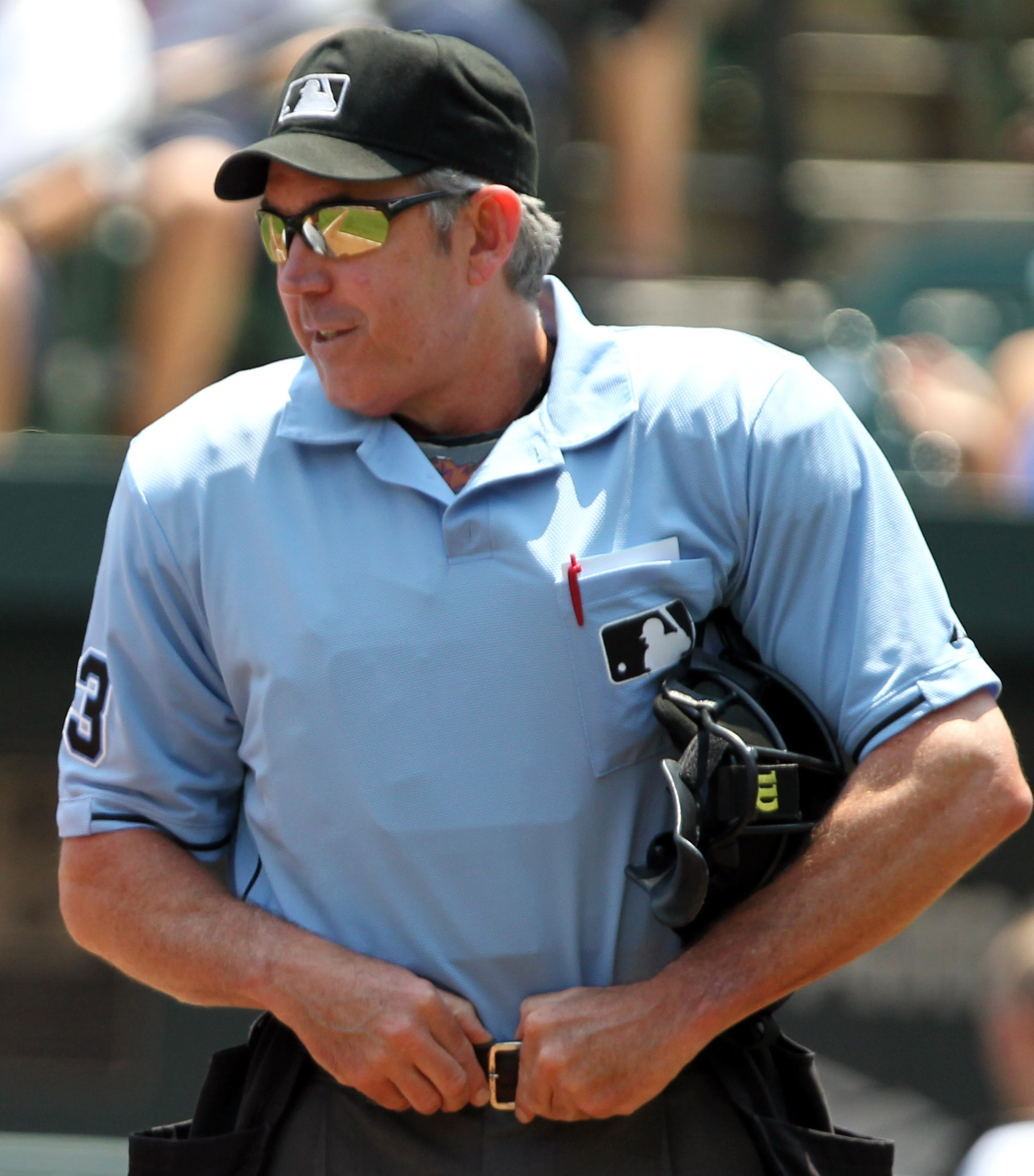
- Winters in 2011
- Born: November 19, 1958 (age 66); Oceanside, California, U.S.

MLB debut
- July 9, 1988

Last appearance
- August 4, 2019

Career highlights and awards
- Special Assignments: All-Star Games (1995, 2007, 2010, 2016); Wild Card Games (2012, 2016, 2017); Division Series (1998, 1999, 2000, 2001, 2002, 2006, 2010, 2013, 2014, 2015, 2018); League Championship Series (1997, 2004, 2008, 2011, 2012, 2017); World Series (2002, 2006, 2010, 2015); Olympic Baseball (Tokyo 2020)

Michael John Winters (born November 19, 1958) is an American former umpire in Major League Baseball who has worked in the National League from 1988 to 1999 and throughout both major leagues from 2000 to 2019, wearing number 33. For the 2011 season, Winters was named a crew chief following the retirements of Jerry Crawford, Mike Reilly, and Chuck Meriwether.

== Umpiring career ==
He umpired in the minor leagues from 1982 to 1989 before joining the NL's regular staff in 1990. Winters wore uniform number 33 his entire career. He has officiated the All-Star Game in 1995, 2007, 2010, and 2016, the Division Series in 1998, 1999, 2000, 2001, 2002, 2006, 2010, 2013, 2014, 2015, and 2018, the League Championship Series in 1997, 2004, 2008, 2011, and 2012, and the 2002, 2006, 2010, and 2015 World Series. He was crew chief for the Division Series in 1998, 1999, 2014, and 2018. Winters opted out as the 2020 Major League Baseball season, which was delayed and shortened due to the COVID-19 pandemic. In February 2021, he formally retired.

=== Controversy ===
On September 23, 2007, Winters was involved in a confrontation with San Diego Padres outfielder Milton Bradley, who alleged that Winters baited him. During the argument, Bradley lunged at Winters and tore an anterior cruciate ligament in his knee while being restrained by manager Bud Black. Major League Baseball suspended Winters for the remainder of the 2007 season for directing a profanity at Bradley.

=== Notable games ===
On August 17, 1992, Winters was the home plate umpire for Kevin Gross' no-hitter.

On June 28, 2007, Winters was at second base when Toronto Blue Jay Frank Thomas hit his 500th career home run off Minnesota Twins pitcher Carlos Silva. Later in the game, Thomas was ejected by plate umpire Mark Wegner for arguing balls and strikes, with Toronto manager John Gibbons also getting thrown out.

He was chosen as one of the umpires for the one-game Wild Card playoff between the Atlanta Braves and the St. Louis Cardinals on October 5, 2012.

On July 13, 2013, Winters served as the third base umpire for Tim Lincecum's no-hitter vs San Diego, his first no-hitter as a crew chief.

Winters served as one of three MLB umpire representatives for the November 2014 MLB Japan All-Star Series.

Winters was chosen as the crew chief in the 2017 American League Wild Card Game.

== Personal life ==
Winters went to college at San Diego State University and he currently lives in Carlsbad, California. He completed the New York City Marathon in 2007.

== See also ==
- List of Major League Baseball umpires (disambiguation)
