= Rick Reed (umpire) =

American baseball umpire (1950–2020)

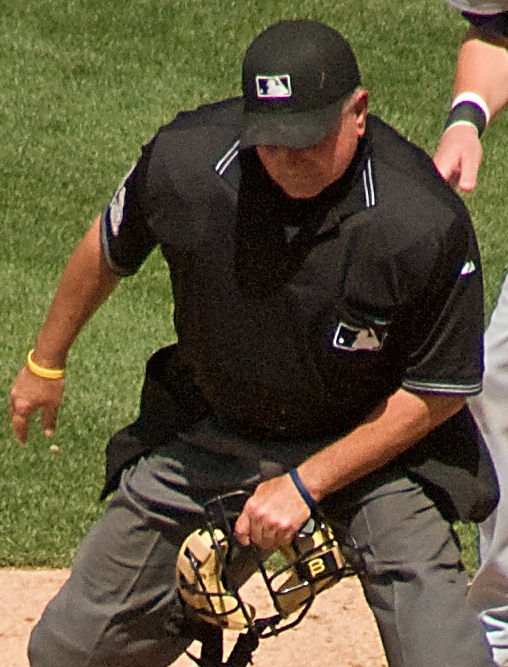
- Reed in 2007
- Born: March 3, 1950; Detroit, Michigan, U.S.
- Died: July 16, 2020 (aged 70); Michigan, U.S.
- Occupation: MLB umpire
- Height: 6 ft 0 in (183 cm)

Rick Alan Reed (March 3, 1950 – July 16, 2020) was an American umpire in Major League Baseball. He joined the American League staff in 1979, and worked throughout both major leagues from 2000 to 2009. He was named a crew chief in 1999. Reed wore uniform number 23.

His professional umpiring career began in the Appalachian League in 1973. Reed earned a B.A. in business administration from Eastern Michigan University while umpiring in the Appalachian League. He advanced through the minors to the International League for the 1978 season. He worked his first major league game toward the end of the umpire's strike in 1979. He returned to the International League when it ended. From 1980 to 1982, Reed was a substitute umpire in the AL. He earned a permanent spot on the AL staff in 1983.

He worked in 7 postseasons, including the 1991 World Series; the American League Championship Series in 1989, 1995, and 1999 (serving as crew chief); and the Division Series in 1997, 2000, and 2001. He worked the All-Star Game in 1986 and 1998. He became a crew chief in 1999 after the retirement of Don Denkinger.

The Detroit native was the home plate umpire for the first ever game at Comerica Park when it opened on Tuesday April 11, 2000, a cold and snowy day.

Reed was the home plate umpire for the final Montreal Expos home game in Olympic Stadium on September 29, 2004, which saw the Florida Marlins defeat the Expos 9–1.

On August 22, 2007, Reed was the home plate umpire when the Texas Rangers set the still standing American League record for most runs scored in a game, with 30 against the Baltimore Orioles.

Reed was a part-time actor in the offseason, including an appearance as the umpire in For Love of the Game starring Kevin Costner.

Having survived two strokes late in his umpiring career and subsequently joining the league office as an observer of umpires in Detroit, Reed died on July 16, 2020, at the age of 70.

== See also ==
- List of Major League Baseball umpires (disambiguation)
