= Terrence Long =

American baseball player (born 1976)

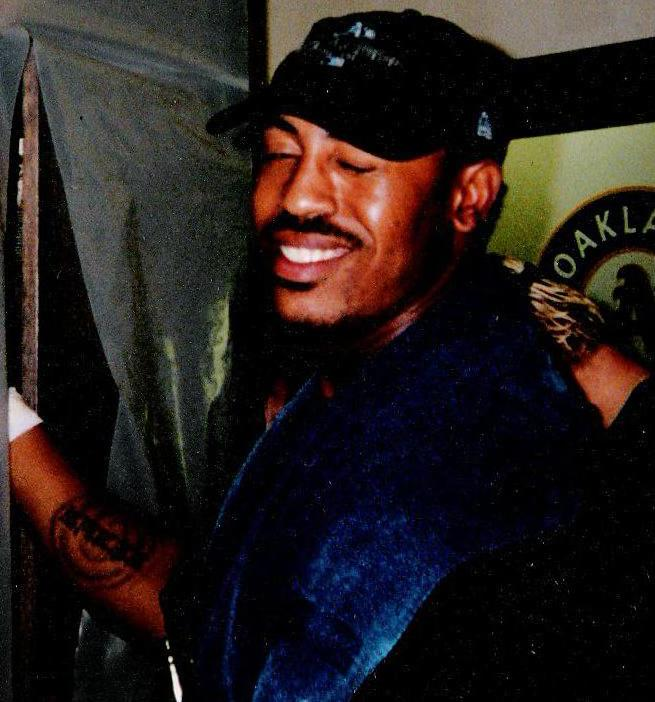
- Long in 2001
- Outfielder
- Born: February 29, 1976 (age 50); Montgomery, Alabama, U.S.
- Batted: Left Threw: Left

MLB debut
- April 14, 1999, for the New York Mets

Last MLB appearance
- June 5, 2006, for the New York Yankees

MLB statistics
- Batting average: .269
- Home runs: 69
- Runs batted in: 376
- Stats at Baseball Reference

Teams
- New York Mets (1999); Oakland Athletics (2000–2003); San Diego Padres (2004); Kansas City Royals (2005); New York Yankees (2006)

Terrence Deon Long (born February 29, 1976) is an American former professional baseball outfielder. He played in Major League Baseball (MLB) from 1999 to 2006 for the New York Mets, Oakland Athletics, San Diego Padres, Kansas City Royals, and New York Yankees.

== Career ==
The New York Mets drafted Long in the first round (20th pick) of the 1994 amateur draft. Long struggled with inconsistency in his five years in the Mets minor league system, but he earned a call-up in early April 1999 and played in three games, failing to get a hit in three pinch-hit appearances, before being sent back down to Triple-A Norfolk.

On July 23, 1999, the Mets traded him and minor leaguer Leo Vasquez to the Oakland Athletics for former All-Star pitcher Kenny Rogers.

In 2000, after a fast start while playing in Triple-A, the Athletics called up Long, and he spent the rest of the season with the major league team. He finished the season by hitting .288 with 18 home runs and 80 RBI's and finished 2nd in Rookie of the Year award voting behind Seattle's Kazuhiro Sasaki.

The 2001 season was much of the same for Long, as he hit .283 with 12 home runs and 85 RBIs, appearing in all 162 games for the A's that season. In August of that season, Long signed a 4-year, $11.6 million extension that would keep him under contract through the 2005 season.

The 2002 campaign was somewhat of decline for Long, as he hit just .240 and had only 67 RBIs but did hit a career-high 16 home runs, as he played in all 162 games for the second consecutive season.

In 2003, Long hit .245 with 14 home runs and 61 RBIs, and played in 140 games, but with Oakland looking to increase their star power within the outfield and Long's tumultuous relationship with manager Ken Macha, Long was seen as a trade candidate heading into the 2003 offseason.

On November 26, 2003, the Athletics traded him and All-Star catcher Ramón Hernández to the San Diego Padres for outfielder Mark Kotsay. Used as a fourth outfielder, Long played in 136 games with the Padres in 2004, he saw his average rise to .295 but hit just 3 home runs and had only 28 RBIs.

With one year remaining on his contract, the Padres traded Long, pitcher Dennis Tankersley, and cash to the Kansas City Royals for pitchers Ryan Bukvich and Darrell May on November 8, 2004. For the 2005 season, Long hit .279 with 6 home runs and 53 RBIs in 137 games for Kansas City.

In the 2005 offseason, Long became a free agent, and eventually signed a minor league contract with the Cincinnati Reds, however he failed to make the major league roster out of spring training, and struggled to a .229 batting average in 15 games with the Reds Triple-A affiliate, the Louisville Bats and was released by Cincinnati on May 5, 2006.

On May 18, 2006, Long signed a minor league contract with the New York Yankees, who later called him to the major league level on May 21, to replace an injured Hideki Matsui. He appeared in 12 games for the Yankees, batting .167 with no home runs and just 2 RBIs. On July 7, Long was designated for assignment by the Yankees.
