= 1998 San Diego Padres season =

1998 San Diego Padres
- National League champions National League West champions
- League: National League
- Division: West
- Ballpark: Qualcomm Stadium
- City: San Diego, California
- Record: 98–64 (.605)
- Divisional place: 1st
- Owners: John Moores
- General managers: Kevin Towers
- Managers: Bruce Bochy
- Television: KUSI-TV; 4SD (Mark Grant, Mel Proctor, Rick Sutcliffe)
- Radio: KFMB (AM) (Jerry Coleman, Ted Leitner, Bob Chandler)

The 1998 San Diego Padres season was the 30th season in franchise history. The Padres won the National League championship and advanced to the World Series for the second time in franchise history.

San Diego featured five All-Stars: pitchers Andy Ashby, Kevin Brown, and Trevor Hoffman, and outfielders Tony Gwynn and Greg Vaughn. Brown and Hoffman were two of the premier pitchers in baseball for 1998. Brown led the staff in wins, earned run average, and strikeouts, and he also finished in the league's top five in each category. Hoffman saved 53 games and was voted the NL Rolaids Relief Man Award for best closer in the league. Ashby was the team's number two starter with 17 wins.

The Padres offense was led by Vaughn, who had the greatest season of his career in 1998. He ended up winning both the Comeback Player of the Year Award and the Silver Slugger Award. And in a season headlined by sluggers Mark McGwire and Sammy Sosa, Vaughn was matching them in home runs before finishing with 50 (compared to 70 for McGwire and 66 for Sosa). Former MVP Ken Caminiti was second on the team in home runs and runs batted in. Gwynn had a .321 batting average.

In the regular season, San Diego won the NL Western Division. Their 98–64 record was third-best in the National League, behind the Houston Astros and the Atlanta Braves. Facing those teams in the NLDS and NLCS respectively, the Padres defeated both teams 3-1 and 4-2 to win their second NL pennant. The Padres were swept in the World Series by the New York Yankees.

== Offseason ==
- November 26, 1997: Jorge Velandia was traded by the San Diego Padres with Doug Bochtler to the Oakland Athletics for David Newhan and Don Wengert.
- December 15, 1997: Derrek Lee was traded by the San Diego Padres with Steve Hoff (minors) and Rafael Medina to the Florida Marlins for Kevin Brown.

== Regular season ==
=== Opening Day starters ===
Player	Pos
Quilvio Veras	2B
Steve Finley	CF
Tony Gwynn	RF
Ken Caminiti	3B
Greg Vaughn	LF
Wally Joyner	1B
Carlos Hernández	C
Chris Gomez	SS
Kevin Brown	P

=== Season standings ===
NL West
Team	W	L	Pct.	GB	Home	Road
San Diego Padres	98	64	.605	—	54‍–‍27	44‍–‍37
San Francisco Giants	89	74	.546	9½	49‍–‍32	40‍–‍42
Los Angeles Dodgers	83	79	.512	15	48‍–‍33	35‍–‍46
Colorado Rockies	77	85	.475	21	42‍–‍39	35‍–‍46
Arizona Diamondbacks	65	97	.401	33	34‍–‍47	31‍–‍50

=== Game log ===
1998 game log: 98–64 (Home: 54–27; Away: 44–37)
March/April: 19–7 (Home: 9–3; Away: 10–4)

#	Date	Opponent	Score	Win	Loss	Save	Attendance	Record	Streak
1	March 31	@ Reds	10–2	Brown (1–0)	Remlinger (0–1)	—	54,578	1–0	W1
2	April 1	@ Reds	10–9	Hamilton (1–0)	Sullivan (0–1)	Hoffman (1)	13,706	2–0	W2
3	April 2	@ Reds	1–5	Cooke (1–0)	Ashby (0–1)	Shaw (1)	13,630	2–1	L1
4	April 3	@ Cardinals	13–5	Langston (1–0)	Aybar (0–1)	—	26,760	3–1	W1
5	April 4	@ Cardinals	6–8	Mercker (1–0)	Smith (0–1)	Bottenfield (1)	34,292	3–2	L1
6	April 5	@ Cardinals	8–7	Hoffman (1–0)	Looper (0–1)	Miceli (1)	35,499	4–2	W1
7	April 7	Reds	3–2 (10)	Hoffman (2–0)	Shaw (0–1)	—	55,454	5–2	W2
8	April 8	Reds	6–3	Ashby (1–1)	White (0–1)	Hoffman (2)	19,626	6–2	W3
9	April 9	Reds	6–2	Boehringer (1–0)	Tomko (1–1)	—	24,482	7–2	W4
10	April 10	Diamondbacks	6–4	Miceli (1–0)	Rodriguez (0–1)	—	27,243	8–2	W5
11	April 11	Diamondbacks	7–0	Smith (1–1)	Adamson (0–1)	—	37,753	9–2	W6
12	April 12	Diamondbacks	4–2	Hamilton (2–0)	Blair (0–3)	Hoffman (3)	26,217	10–2	W7
13	April 13	Diamondbacks	1–0	Ashby (2–1)	Anderson (1–2)	—	36,278	11–2	W8
14	April 14	@ Giants	7–13	Tavarez (2–1)	Boehringer (1–1)	—	11,669	11–3	L1
15	April 15	@ Giants	1–0	Brown (2–0)	Darwin (1–1)	—	16,255	12–3	W1
16	April 17	@ Pirates	7–5	Boehringer (2–1)	Tabaka (0–1)	Hoffman (4)	12,555	13–3	W2
17	April 18	@ Pirates	7–5 (10)	Miceli (2–0)	Loiselle (1–1)	Hoffman (5)	14,728	14–3	W3
–	April 19	@ Pirates	Postponed (rain); rescheduled for May 20						
18	April 21	@ Cubs	3–5	Trachsel (3–1)	Brown (2–1)	Beck (7)	20,363	14–4	L1
19	April 22	@ Cubs	3–2 (14)	Boehringer (3–1)	Telemaco (0–1)	Reyes (1)	15,852	15–4	W1
20	April 23	@ Cubs	4–1	Ashby (3–1)	Clark (2–2)	Hoffman (6)	20,276	16–4	W2
21	April 24	Pirates	2–4	Schmidt (3–1)	Smith (1–2)	Rincon (1)	26,413	16–5	L1
22	April 25	Pirates	4–3 (16)	Reyes (1–0)	Martinez (0–1)	—	53,710	17–5	W1
23	April 26	Pirates	0–6	Lieber (1–3)	Brown (2–2)	—	42,281	17–6	L1
24	April 27	Cubs	1–3	Tapani (4–1)	Hamilton (2–1)	Beck (8)	20,106	17–7	L2
25	April 28	Cubs	7–3	Ashby (4–1)	Clark (2–3)	Hitchcock (1)	21,024	18–7	W1
26	April 30	@ Marlins	4–1	Smith (2–2)	Meadows (3–3)	Hoffman (7)	14,562	19–7	W2

May: 16–14 (Home: 8–2; Away: 8–12)

#	Date	Opponent	Score	Win	Loss	Save	Attendance	Record	Streak
27	May 1	@ Marlins	5–6 (11)	Powell (3–2)	Miceli (2–1)	—	19,465	19–8	L1
28	May 2	@ Marlins	8–7	Hamilton (3–1)	Ludwick (1–3)	Hoffman (8)	22,383	20–8	W1
29	May 3	@ Marlins	0–1	Sanchez (1–1)	Ashby (4–2)	Powell (1)	18,644	20–9	L1
30	May 4	@ Brewers	13–5	Hitchcock (1–0)	Mercedes (2–2)	Wengert (1)	9,357	21–9	W1
31	May 5	@ Brewers	13–4	Smith (3–2)	Wagner (1–3)	—	9,162	22–9	W2
32	May 6	@ Brewers	2–3	D. Jones (2–1)	Reyes (1–1)	—	13,381	22–10	L1
33	May 7	@ Braves	3–6	Smoltz (3–0)	Hamilton (3–2)	Ligtenberg (3)	31,811	22–11	L2
34	May 8	@ Braves	3–2	Ashby (5–2)	Glavine (4–2)	Hoffman (9)	37,490	23–11	W1
35	May 9	@ Braves	4–6	Millwood (5–1)	Van Ryn (0–1)	Ligtenberg (4)	46,160	23–12	L1
36	May 10	@ Braves	5–8	Cather (2–1)	Wall (0–1)	Ligtenberg (5)	33,376	23–13	L2
37	May 11	Mets	2–1	Brown (3–2)	A. Leiter (3–2)	Hoffman (10)	15,291	24–13	W1
–	May 12	Mets	Postponed (rain); rescheduled for May 14						
38	May 13	Mets	3–4	B. Jones (2–3)	Hamilton (3–3)	Franco (7)	14,929	24–14	L1
39	May 14 (1)	Mets	3–1	Boehringer (4–1)	Cook (2–2)	Hoffman (11)	N/A	25–14	W1
40	May 14 (2)	Mets	6–2	Miceli (3–1)	McMichael (1–1)	—	26,488	26–14	W2
41	May 15	Phillies	7–6	Boehringer (5–1)	Grace (1–5)	Hoffman (12)	25,157	27–14	W3
42	May 16	Phillies	3–2	Reyes (2–1)	M. Leiter (2–1)	—	53,117	28–14	W4
43	May 17	Phillies	3–1	Wall (1–1)	Schilling (5–4)	Hoffman (13)	27,913	29–14	W5
44	May 19	@ Pirates	0–3	Silva (5–3)	Hamilton (3–4)	Loiselle (10)	10,493	29–15	L1
45	May 20 (1)	@ Pirates	2–5	Cordova (5–3)	Ashby (5–3)	Loiselle (11)	N/A	29–16	L2
46	May 20 (2)	@ Pirates	8–3	Hitchcock (2–0)	Peters (0–3)	—	17,248	30–16	W1
47	May 21	@ Pirates	2–3	Schmidt (7–1)	Brown (3–3)	Rincon (2)	10,222	30–17	L1
48	May 22	@ Astros	9–6	Miceli (4–1)	Nitkowski (1–2)	Hoffman (14)	28,550	31–17	W1
49	May 23	@ Astros	3–4	Miller (2–0)	Miceli (4–2)	Wagner (12)	36,281	31–18	L1
50	May 24	@ Astros	2–5	Schourek (2–2)	Hamilton (3–5)	Wagner (13)	25,701	31–19	L2
51	May 25	@ Diamondbacks	2–3	Springer (3–2)	Ashby (5–4)	Olson (5)	45,367	31–20	L3
52	May 26	@ Diamondbacks	12–1	Brown (4–3)	Suppan (1–5)	—	41,204	32–20	W1
53	May 27	@ Diamondbacks	6–4	Wall (2–1)	Benes (3–5)	Hoffman (15)	42,844	33–20	W2
54	May 29	Cardinals	3–8	Petkovsek (3–1)	Hamilton (3–6)	—	36,648	33–21	L1
55	May 30	Cardinals	3–2	Ashby (6–4)	Brantley (0–1)	—	54,089	34–21	W1
56	May 31	Cardinals	7–3	Brown (5–3)	Lowe (0–1)	—	42,618	35–21	W2

June: 18–9 (Home: 13–4; Away: 5–5)

#	Date	Opponent	Score	Win	Loss	Save	Attendance	Record	Streak
57	June 1	Cardinals	3–2	Hitchcock (3–0)	Stottlemyre (6–5)	Hoffman (16)	22,156	36–21	W3
58	June 2	Astros	3–4	Reynolds (6–3)	Reyes (2–2)	Wagner (15)	15,735	36–22	L1
59	June 3	Astros	2–8	Bergman (5–3)	Hamilton (3–7)	—	13,229	36–23	L2
60	June 4	Astros	5–1	Ashby (7–4)	Hampton (7–3)	—	21,027	37–23	W1
61	June 5	@ Rangers	7–8	Crabtree (3–0)	Wall (2–2)	Wetteland (15)	37,903	37–24	L1
62	June 6	@ Rangers	0–3	Burkett (4–5)	Hitchcock (3–1)	Wetteland (16)	46,022	37–25	L2
63	June 7	@ Rangers	17–8	Miceli (5–2)	Patterson (1–2)	—	46,372	38–25	W1
64	June 8	Reds	4–2	Hamilton (4–7)	Sullivan (1–3)	Hoffman (17)	14,620	39–25	W2
65	June 9	Reds	5–1	Ashby (8–4)	Tomko (5–5)	Hoffman (18)	14,857	40–25	W3
66	June 10	Reds	2–1	Brown (6–3)	Shaw (1–3)	—	12,957	41–25	W4
67	June 12	Giants	10–3	Miceli (6–2)	Reed (2–1)	—	60,789	42–25	W5
68	June 13	Giants	4–2	Hamilton (5–7)	Gardner (5–3)	Hoffman (19)	54,390	43–25	W6
69	June 14	Giants	3–2	Ashby (9–4)	Darwin (6–4)	Hoffman (20)	40,151	44–25	W7
70	June 16	Dodgers	10–6	Brown (7–3)	Park (5–4)	Hoffman (21)	38,166	45–25	W8
71	June 17	Dodgers	3–2 (12)	Hoffman (3–0)	Reyes (0–2)	—	35,765	46–25	W9
72	June 18	@ Giants	7–6	Ramirez (1–0)	Johnstone (2–4)	Miceli (2)	16,899	47–25	W10
73	June 19	@ Giants	9–5	Ashby (10–4)	Darwin (6–5)	—	23,034	48–25	W11
74	June 20	@ Giants	2–5	Estes (6–5)	Langston (1–1)	Nen (22)	35,782	48–26	L1
75	June 21	@ Giants	5–1	Brown (8–3)	Hershiser (6–5)	Hoffman (22)	46,506	49–26	W1
76	June 22	@ Mariners	5–3	Miceli (7–2)	Fassero (5–5)	Hoffman (23)	41,571	50–26	W2
77	June 23	@ Mariners	3–5	Moyer (5–6)	Hamilton (5–8)	Slocumb (2)	30,961	50–27	L1
78	June 24	Mariners	1–2	Johnson (7–6)	Ashby (10–5)	—	36,900	50–28	L2
79	June 25	Mariners	6–0	Langston (2–1)	Cloude (3–7)	Wall (1)	32,626	51–28	W1
80	June 26	Angels	6–3	Brown (9–3)	Dickson (8–5)	Hoffman (24)	40,621	52–28	W2
81	June 27	Angels	5–1	Hitchcock (4–1)	Olivares (5–3)	—	31,948	53–28	W3
82	June 28	Angels	3–11	Washburn (4–0)	Hamilton (5–9)	—	41,547	53–29	L1
83	June 30	@ Athletics	10–12	Taylor (3–5)	Miceli (7–3)	Fetters (4)	10,263	53–30	L2

July: 18–8 (Home: 8–2; Away: 10–6)

#	Date	Opponent	Score	Win	Loss	Save	Attendance	Record	Streak
84	July 1	@ Athletics	8–4	Brown (10–3)	Stein (3–5)	—	10,154	54–30	W1
85	July 2	@ Athletics	2–7	Rogers (8–3)	Hitchcock (4–2)	—	40,374	54–31	L1
86	July 3	Rockies	4–2	Hamilton (6–9)	DeJean (3–1)	Hoffman (25)	40,588	55–31	W1
87	July 4	Rockies	9–1	Langston (3–1)	Jones (2–3)	—	61,148	56–31	W2
88	July 5	Rockies	7–2	Ashby (11–5)	Astacio (6–9)	—	32,649	57–31	W3
69th All-Star Game in Denver, Colorado
89	July 9	@ Dodgers	3–12	Park (8–5)	Langston (3–2)	—	41,250	57–32	L1
90	July 10	@ Dodgers	2–6	Osuna (5–0)	Miceli (7–4)	—	53,245	57–33	L2
91	July 11	@ Dodgers	4–1	Ashby (12–5)	Valdez (6–9)	Hoffman (26)	48,950	58–33	W1
92	July 12	@ Dodgers	6–3	Hamilton (7–9)	Bohanon (2–5)	Hoffman (27)	42,056	59–33	W2
93	July 13	@ Rockies	5–9	Jones (3–3)	Hitchcock (4–3)	—	48,098	59–34	L1
94	July 14	@ Rockies	8–7	Sanders (1–2)	Kile (6–12)	Hoffman (28)	48,114	60–34	W1
95	July 15	@ Rockies	6–2	Brown (11–3)	Wright (5–9)	—	48,369	61–34	W2
96	July 17	@ Reds	13–3	Ashby (13–5)	Remlinger (6–10)	—	26,443	62–34	W3
97	July 18	@ Reds	2–1	Hamilton (8–9)	Harnisch (7–4)	Hoffman (29)	30,289	63–34	W4
98	July 19	@ Reds	7–6	Wall (3–2)	Hudek (2–5)	Hoffman (30)	23,439	64–34	W5
99	July 20	Cardinals	1–13	Morris (1–0)	Langston (3–3)	—	32,339	64–35	L1
100	July 21	Cardinals	6–3	Brown (12–3)	Mercker (5–8)	Hoffman (31)	37,145	65–35	W1
101	July 22	Diamondbacks	9–3	Ashby (14–5)	Blair (4–14)	—	18,780	66–35	W2
102	July 23	Diamondbacks	3–0	Hamilton (9–9)	Anderson (7–9)	Hoffman (32)	24,278	67–35	W3
103	July 24	Astros	1–2	Schourek (6–6)	Hitchcock (4–4)	Magnante (2)	31,047	67–36	L1
104	July 25	Astros	6–5	Langston (4–3)	Reynolds (12–6)	Hoffman (33)	54,176	68–36	W1
105	July 26	Astros	5–4 (10)	Wall (4–2)	Magnante (3–5)	—	41,034	69–36	W2
106	July 28	@ Mets	3–7	Nomo (5–8)	Ashby (14–6)	McMichael (2)	21,005	69–37	L1
107	July 29	@ Mets	6–7	Rojas (4–2)	Wall (4–3)	Franco (21)	23,694	69–38	L2
108	July 30	@ Mets	3–1 (10)	Miceli (8–4)	Cook (6–4)	Hoffman (34)	22,882	70–38	W1
109	July 31	@ Expos	5–4	Brown (13–3)	Pavano (3–5)	Hoffman (35)	10,340	71–38	W2

August: 18–11 (Home: 10–6; Away: 8–5)

#	Date	Opponent	Score	Win	Loss	Save	Attendance	Record	Streak
110	August 1	@ Expos	2–4	Bennett (4–4)	Langston (4–4)	Urbina (24)	28,937	71–39	L1
111	August 2	@ Expos	4–1	Ashby (15–6)	Vasquez (3–10)	Hoffman (36)	14,485	72–39	W1
112	August 3	@ Expos	1–6	Hermanson (9–9)	Boehringer (5–2)	—	10,129	72–40	L1
113	August 4	Phillies	3–1	Hitchcock (5–4)	Beech (3–8)	Hoffman (37)	22,125	73–40	W1
114	August 5	Phillies	4–0	Brown (14–3)	Schilling (10–11)	—	19,109	74–40	W2
115	August 6	Phillies	2–3 (11)	Leiter (6–2)	Hoffman (3–1)	—	19,007	74–41	L1
116	August 7	Marlins	6–3 (13)	Sanders (2–2)	Speier (0–1)	—	39,145	75–41	W1
117	August 9	Marlins	6–5	Hitchcock (6–4)	Larkin (3–7)	Hoffman (38)	21,065	76–41	W2
118	August 10	Marlins	2–3	Hernandez (10–8)	Brown (14–4)	—	41,514	76–42	L1
119	August 11	Braves	3–1	Hamilton (10–9)	Neagle (11–10)	Hoffman (39)	31,430	77–42	W1
120	August 12	Braves	5–1	Ashby (16–6)	Maddux (15–6)	—	40,597	78–42	W2
121	August 13	Braves	0–5	Glavine (16–4)	Langston (4–5)	—	34,547	78–43	L1
122	August 14	Brewers	7–0	Hitchcock (7–4)	Karl (9–7)	—	38,639	79–43	W1
123	August 16 (1)	Brewers	4–0	Brown (15–4)	Roque (0–1)	—	N/A	80–43	W2
124	August 16 (2)	Brewers	2–4	Pulsipher (1–0)	Hamilton (10–10)	Wickman (20)	29,319	80–44	L1
125	August 18	@ Marlins	7–5	Miceli (9–4)	Alfonseca (2–6)	Hoffman (40)	23,275	81–44	W1
126	August 19	@ Marlins	0–6	Meadows (10–9)	Hitchcock (7–5)	—	15,409	81–45	L1
127	August 20	@ Braves	2–0	Brown (16–4)	Millwood (14–7)	Hoffman (41)	43,730	82–45	W1
128	August 21	@ Braves	4–5	Smoltz (12–2)	Hamilton (10–11)	Ligtenberg (21)	48,268	82–46	L1
129	August 22	@ Brewers	4–8	Roque (1–1)	Langston (4–6)	Wickman (21)	26,253	82–47	L2
130	August 23	@ Brewers	13–11 (10)	Hoffman (4–1)	Wickman (6–7)	—	27,641	83–47	W1
131	August 24	@ Brewers	7–2	Hitchcock (8–5)	Woodard (9–9)	—	14,121	84–47	W2
132	August 25	@ Phillies	5–3	Brown (17–4)	Schilling (12–12)	Hoffman (42)	18,100	85–47	W3
133	August 26	@ Phillies	2–0	Hamilton (11–11)	Portugal (8–4)	Hoffman (43)	15,656	86–47	W4
134	August 27	@ Phillies	8–1	Spencer (1–0)	Byrd (2–1)	—	23,371	87–47	W5
135	August 28	Expos	12–8	Wall (5–3)	Maddux (2–3)	—	21,518	88–47	W6
136	August 29	Expos	1–3	Hermanson (12–10)	Hitchcock (8–6)	Urbina (27)	52,661	88–48	L1
137	August 30	Expos	1–2	Bullinger (1–0)	Brown (17–5)	Urbina (28)	21,765	88–49	L2
138	August 31	Expos	5–2	Hamilton (12–11)	Pavano (4–7)	Hoffman (44)	13,449	89–49	W1

September: 9–15 (Home: 6–10; Away: 3–5)

#	Date	Opponent	Score	Win	Loss	Save	Attendance	Record	Streak
139	September 1	Mets	9–8	Myers (4–4)	Wendell (4–1)	Hoffman (45)	18,489	90–49	W2
140	September 2	Mets	1–4	Reynoso (6–1)	Ashby (16–7)	Franco (31)	17,565	90–50	L1
141	September 4	@ Rockies	5–11	Veres (3–1)	Sanders (2–3)	—	44,596	90–51	L2
142	September 5	@ Rockies	4–2	Brown (18–5)	Kile (10–16)	Hoffman (46)	42,930	91–51	W1
143	September 6	@ Rockies	2–12	Wright (9–12)	Hamilton (12–12)	—	46,240	91–52	L1
144	September 7	Giants	4–5	Tavarez (4–3)	Myers (4–5)	Nen (35)	19,393	91–53	L2
145	September 8	Giants	1–5	Rueter (15–9)	Ashby (16–8)	—	19,362	91–54	L3
146	September 9	Giants	8–3	Hitchcock (9–6)	Estes (7–10)	Hoffman (47)	26,589	92–54	W1
147	September 10	Dodgers	3–4	Park (13–8)	Brown (18–6)	Shaw (42)	26,018	92–55	L1
148	September 11	Dodgers	1–0	Hamilton (13–12)	Bohanon (6–10)	Hoffman (48)	32,830	93–55	W1
149	September 12	Dodgers	8–7	Sanders (3–3)	Maloney (0–1)	Hoffman (49)	60,823	94–55	W2
150	September 13	Dodgers	4–5 (10)	Weaver (1–0)	Wall (5–4)	Shaw (43)	37,390	94–56	L1
151	September 14	Cubs	4–3	Miceli (10–4)	Karchner (5–5)	Hoffman (50)	23,948	95–56	W1
152	September 15	Cubs	2–4	Tapani (19–7)	Brown (18–7)	Beck (47)	37,995	95–57	L1
153	September 16	Cubs	3–6	Mulholland (5–5)	Miceli (10–5)	Beck (48)	49,981	95–58	L2
154	September 17	Cubs	3–4 (10)	Heredia (3–3)	Hoffman (4–2)	Beck (49)	32,047	95–59	L3
155	September 18	Rockies	1–4	Astacio (13–14)	Ashby (16–9)	Veres (6)	28,158	95–60	L4
156	September 19	Rockies	4–1	Clement (1–0)	Thomson (8–11)	Hoffman (51)	54,042	96–60	W1
157	September 20	Rockies	0–1 (11)	Kile (13–16)	Myers (4–6)	Veres (7)	37,939	96–61	L1
158	September 22	@ Dodgers	2–3	Park (14–9)	Hamilton (13–13)	Shaw (45)	29,255	96–62	L2
159	September 23	@ Dodgers	3–2	Ashby (17–9)	Bohanon (7–11)	Hoffman (52)	29,163	97–62	W1
160	September 25	@ Diamondbacks	3–6	Olson (3–4)	Myers (4–7)	—	47,288	97–63	L1
161	September 26	@ Diamondbacks	2–3	Telemaco (7–10)	Hitchcock (9–7)	Olson (30)	48,196	97–64	L2
162	September 27	@ Diamondbacks	3–2	Clement (2–0)	Small (4–2)	Hoffman (53)	48,390	98–64	W1

=== Postseason ===
1998 postseason game log: 7-7 (Home: 3-4; Away: 4-3)
National League Division Series: 3-1 (Home: 2-0; Away: 1-1)

#	Date	Opponent	Score	Win	Loss	Save	Attendance	Series
1	Sep 29	@ Astros	2–1	Brown (1-0)	Johnson (0-1)	Hoffman (1)	50,080	1-0
2	Oct 1	@ Astros	4–5	Wagner (1-0)	Miceli (0-1)		45,550	1-1
3	Oct 3	Astros	2–1	Miceli (1-1)	Elarton (0-1)	Hoffman (2)	65,235	2-1
4	Oct 4	Astros	6–1	Hitchcock (1-0)	Johnson (0-2)		64,898	3-1

National League Championship Series: 4-2 (Home: 1-2; Away: 3-0)

#	Date	Opponent	Score	Win	Loss	Save	Attendance	Series
1	Oct 7	@ Braves	3–2 (10)	Hoffman (1-0)	Ligtenberg (0-1)	Wall (1)	42,117	1-0
2	Oct 8	@ Braves	3–0	Brown (2-0)	Glavine (0-1)		43,083	2-0
3	Oct 10	Braves	4–1	Hitchcock (2-0)	Maddux (1-1)	Hoffman (3)	62,799	3-0
4	Oct 11	Braves	3–8	Martínez (1-0)	Hamilton (0-1)		65,042	3-1
5	Oct 12	Braves	6–7	Rocker (1-0)	Brown (2-1)	Maddux (1)	58,988	3-2
6	Oct 14	@ Braves	5–0	Hitchcock (3-0)	Glavine (0-2)		50,988	4-2

World Series: 0-4 (Home: 0-2; Away: 0-2)

#	Date	Opponent	Score	Win	Loss	Save	Attendance	Series
1	Oct 17	@ Yankees	6–9	Wells (4-0)	Wall (1-0)	Rivera (4)	56,712	0-1
2	Oct 18	@ Yankees	3–9	Hernández (2-0)	Ashby (0-1)		56,692	0-2
3	Oct 20	Yankees	4–5	Mendoza (1-0)	Hoffman (1-1)	Rivera (5)	64,667	0-3
4	Oct 21	Yankees	0–3	Pettitte (2-1)	Brown (2-2)	Rivera (6)	65,427	0-4

=== Record vs. opponents ===
1998 National League record Source: MLB Standings Grid – 1998
Team	AZ	ATL	CHC	CIN	COL	FLA	HOU	LAD	MIL	MON	NYM	PHI	PIT	SD	SF	STL	AL
Arizona	—	1–8	5–7	4–5	6–6	6–2	4–5	4–8	6–3	2–7	4–5	2–7	6–3	3–9	5–7	2–7	5–8
Atlanta	8–1	—	3–6	7–2	5–3	7–5	4–5	8–1	7–2	6–6	9–3	8–4	7–2	5–4	7–2	6–3	9–7
Chicago	7–5	6–3	—	6–5	7–2	7–2	4–7	4–5	6–6	7–2	4–5	3–6	8–3	5–4	7–3	4–7	5–8
Cincinnati	5–4	2–7	5–6	—	4–5	9–0	3–8	5–4	6–5	8–1	3–6	4–5	5–7	1–11	2–7	8–3	7-6
Colorado	6–6	3–5	2–7	5–4	—	6–3	6–5	6–6	4–7	7–2	3–6	5–4	5–4	5–7	7–5	3–6	4–8
Florida	2–6	5–7	2–7	0–9	3–6	—	3–6	4–5	0–9	5–7	5–7	6–6	3–6	4–5	0–9	4–5	8–8
Houston	5–4	5–4	7–4	8–3	5–6	6–3	—	3–6	9–2	7–2	5–4	7–2	9–2	5–4	6–3	5–7	10–4
Los Angeles	8–4	1–8	5–4	4–5	6–6	5–4	6–3	—	5–4	5–4	3–5	5–4	7–5	5–7	6–6	4–5	8–5
Milwaukee	3–6	2–7	6–6	5–6	7–4	9–0	2–9	4–5	—	6–3	1–8	4–5	6–5	3–6	5–4	3–8	8–6
Montreal	7–2	6–6	2–7	1–8	2–7	7–5	2–7	4–5	3–6	—	8–4	5–7	2–7	4–4	3–6	3–6	6–10
New York	5–4	3–9	5–4	6–3	6–3	7–5	4–5	5–3	8–1	4–8	—	8–4	4–5	4–5	4–5	6–3	9–7
Philadelphia	7–2	4–8	6–3	5–4	4–5	6–6	2–7	4–5	5–4	7–5	4–8	—	8–1	1–8	2–6	3–6	7–9
Pittsburgh	3–6	2–7	3–8	7–5	4–5	6–3	2–9	5–7	5–6	7–2	5–4	1–8	—	5–4	2–7	6–5	6–7
San Diego	9–3	4–5	4–5	11–1	7–5	5–4	4–5	7–5	6–3	4–4	5–4	8–1	4–5	—	8–4	6–3	6–7
San Francisco	7–5	2–7	3–7	7–2	5–7	9–0	3–6	6–6	4–5	6–3	5–4	6–2	7–2	4–8	—	7–5	8–5
St. Louis	7–2	3–6	7–4	3–8	6–3	5-4	7–5	5–4	8–3	6–3	3–6	6–3	5–6	3–6	5–7	—	4–9

=== Notable transactions ===
- April 8, 1998: Buddy Carlyle was traded by the Cincinnati Reds to the San Diego Padres for Marc Kroon.
- June 20, 1998: Jim Leyritz was traded by the Boston Red Sox with Ethan Faggett (minors) to the San Diego Padres for Carlos Reyes, Mandy Romero, and Darío Veras.
- August 6, 1998: Randy Myers was traded by the Toronto Blue Jays to the San Diego Padres for Brian Loyd (minors).
- August 31, 1998: John Vander Wal was traded by the Colorado Rockies to the San Diego Padres for a player to be named later. The San Diego Padres sent Kevin Burford (minors) (October 29, 1998) to the Colorado Rockies to complete the trade.

=== Roster ===
1998 San Diego Padres
Roster
Pitchers: 43 Andy Ashby; 37 Brian Boehringer; 27 Kevin Brown; 55 Jim Bruske; 31 Matt Clement; 39 Will Cunnane; 50 Joey Hamilton; 41 Sterling Hitchcock; 51 Trevor Hoffman; 32 Marc Kroon; 24 Mark Langston; 33 Dan Miceli; 18 Randy Myers; 32 Roberto Ramírez; 56 Carlos Reyes; 26 Scott Sanders; 47 Pete Smith; 58 Stan Spencer; 49 Ben Van Ryn; 36 Donne Wall; 26 Don Wengert	Catchers: 25 Ben Davis; 9 Carlos Hernández; 13 Jim Leyritz; 20 Greg Myers; 3 Mandy Romero; Infielders: 14 George Arias; 21 Ken Caminiti; 29 Archi Cianfrocco; 17 Ed Giovanola; 10 Chris Gomez; 22 Wally Joyner; 2,3 Andy Sheets; 4 Quilvio Veras; 25 Eddie Williams	Outfielders: 12 Steve Finley; 19 Tony Gwynn; 7 James Mouton; 28 Rubén Rivera; 8 Mark Sweeney; 44 John Vander Wal; 23 Greg Vaughn	Manager: 15 Bruce Bochy; Coaches: 38 Greg Booker (bullpen); 34 Dave Stewart (pitching); 24 Davey Lopes (first base); 11 Tim Flannery (third base); 5 Rob Picciolo (bench); 16 Merv Rettenmund (hitting)

== Player stats ==
=== Batting ===
==== Starters by position ====
Note: Pos = Position; G = Games played; AB = At bats; H = Hits; Avg. = Batting average; HR = Home runs; RBI = Runs batted in

Pos	Player	G	AB	H	Avg.	HR	RBI
C	Carlos Hernández	129	390	102	.262	9	52
1B	Wally Joyner	131	439	131	.298	12	80
2B	Quilvio Veras	138	517	138	.267	6	45
SS	Chris Gomez	145	449	120	.267	4	39
3B	Ken Caminiti	131	452	114	.252	29	82
LF	Greg Vaughn	158	573	156	.272	50	119
CF	Steve Finley	159	619	154	.249	14	67
RF	Tony Gwynn	127	461	148	.321	16	69

==== Other batters ====
Note: G = Games played; AB = At bats; H = Hits; Avg. = Batting average; HR = Home runs; RBI = Runs batted in

Player	G	AB	H	Avg.	HR	RBI
Andy Sheets	88	194	47	.242	7	29
Mark Sweeney	122	192	45	.234	2	15
Rubén Rivera	95	172	36	.209	6	29
Greg Myers	69	171	42	.246	4	20
Jim Leyritz	62	143	38	.266	4	18
Ed Giovanola	92	139	32	.230	1	9
Archi Cianfrocco	40	72	9	.125	1	5
James Mouton	55	63	12	.190	0	7
George Arias	20	36	7	.194	1	4
Eddie Williams	17	28	4	.143	0	3
John Vander Wal	20	25	6	.240	0	0
Mandy Romero	6	9	0	.000	0	0
Ben Davis	1	1	0	.000	0	0

=== Pitching ===
==== Starting pitchers ====
Note: G = Games pitched; IP = Innings pitched; W = Wins; L = Losses; ERA = Earned run average; SO = Strikeouts

Player	G	IP	W	L	ERA	SO
Kevin Brown	36	257.0	18	7	2.38	257
Andy Ashby	33	226.2	17	9	3.34	151
Joey Hamilton	34	217.1	13	13	4.27	147
Sterling Hitchcock	39	176.1	9	7	3.93	158
Mark Langston	22	81.1	4	6	5.86	56
Stan Spencer	6	30.2	1	0	4.70	31

==== Other pitchers ====
Note: G = Games pitched; IP = Innings pitched; W = Wins; L = Losses; ERA = Earned run average; SO = Strikeouts

Player	G	IP	W	L	ERA	SO
Pete Smith	10	43.1	3	2	4.78	36
Matt Clement	4	13.2	2	0	4.61	13

==== Relief pitchers ====
Note: G = Games pitched; W = Wins; L = Losses; SV = Saves; ERA = Earned run average; SO = Strikeouts

Player	G	W	L	SV	ERA	SO
Trevor Hoffman	66	4	2	53	1.48	86
Dan Miceli	67	10	5	2	3.22	70
Brian Boehringer	56	5	2	0	4.36	67
Donne Wall	46	5	4	1	2.43	56
Scott Sanders	23	3	1	0	4.11	26
Roberto Ramírez	21	1	0	0	6.14	17
Carlos Reyes	22	2	2	1	3.58	24
Randy Myers	21	1	3	0	6.28	9
Don Wengert	10	0	0	1	5.93	5
Ben Van Ryn	6	0	1	0	10.13	1
Jim Bruske	4	0	0	0	3.86	4
Will Cunnane	3	0	0	0	6.00	1
Marc Kroon	2	0	0	0	0.00	2

== League honors ==
=== All-Stars ===
- Andy Ashby
- Kevin Brown
- Tony Gwynn, starter
- Trevor Hoffman
- Greg Vaughn

=== Awards ===
- Rolaids Relief Award: Trevor Hoffman
- Comeback Player of the Year Award: Greg Vaughn
- Silver Slugger Award: Greg Vaughn (OF)

=== Statistical leaders ===
Kevin Brown

- #2 ERA (2.38)
- #2 Strikeouts (257)
- #2 WHIP (1.07)
- #2 Innings Pitched (257)
- #4 Wins (18)
- #4 Complete Games (7)

Tony Gwynn

- #1 At-Bats Per Strikeout (25.6)

Trevor Hoffman

- #1 Saves (53)

Greg Vaughn

- #3 Home runs (50)
- #5 Slugging percentage (.597)
- #5 Total Bases (342)

== National League Division Series ==
=== Houston Astros vs. San Diego Padres ===
San Diego wins the series, 3-1

Game	Visitor	Score	Home	Score	Date	Series
1	San Diego	2	Houston	1	September 29	1-0 (SD)
2	San Diego	4	Houston	5	October 1	1-1
3	Houston	1	San Diego	2	October 3	2-1 (SD)
4	Houston	1	San Diego	6	October 4	3-1 (SD)

== National League Championship Series ==
Game	Date	Visitor	Score	Home	Score	Record (SD-Atl)	Attendance
1	October 7	San Diego	3	Atlanta	2	1-0	42,117
2	October 8	San Diego	3	Atlanta	0	2-0	43,083
3	October 10	Atlanta	1	San Diego	4	3-0	62,779
4	October 11	Atlanta	8	San Diego	3	3-1	65,042
5	October 12	Atlanta	7	San Diego	6	3-2	58,988
6	October 14	San Diego	5	Atlanta	0	4-2	50,988
San Diego wins series 4–2 and advances to the World Series

== World Series ==
=== Game 1 ===
October 17, 1998, at Yankee Stadium in New York City

Team	1	2	3	4	5	6	7	8	9	R	H	E
San Diego	0	0	2	0	3	0	0	1	0	6	8	1
New York	0	2	0	0	0	0	7	0	X	9	9	1
WP: David Wells (1-0) LP: Donne Wall (0-1) Sv: Mariano Rivera (1); Home runs: SD: Greg Vaughn 2 (2), Tony Gwynn (1); NYY: Chuck Knoblauch (1), Tino Martinez (1)

In Game 1, Kevin Brown took the hill for the Padres and he was opposed by Yankee ace and ALCS MVP David Wells. The Yankees began the scoring in the 2nd inning, when rookie Ricky Ledée laced a 2-run double into the right field corner with the bases loaded. Wells was battered hard for the only time in the postseason beginning with the 3rd when Greg Vaughn homered to right-center with a man aboard tying the game up at 2 runs apiece. In the 5th, Tony Gwynn smashed a 2-run shot off the facing of the upper deck and that was followed up immediately by Vaughn's second dinger of the night. Trailing 5–2, the Yanks made their comeback in the 7th. Jorge Posada singled and Ledee walked ending the night for Brown. It turned out to be a bad move by Padres manager Bruce Bochy. New York took advantage of the Padres bullpen with a 3-run homer by Chuck Knoblauch that tied the game at 5. Later in the inning, a 2-2 count call by home plate umpire Rich Garcia was decisive. Mark Langston's pitch was shown on television replays to be a strike, which Rich Garcia called a ball. Tino Martinez took advantage of Garcia's call and on the next pitch sent a grand slam into the upper deck making it a 9–5 lead. The Padres score only one more run as the Yankees won game one, 9–6.

=== Game 2 ===
October 18, 1998, at Yankee Stadium in New York City

Team	1	2	3	4	5	6	7	8	9	R	H	E
San Diego	0	0	0	0	1	0	0	2	0	3	10	1
New York	3	3	1	0	2	0	0	0	X	9	16	0
WP: Orlando Hernández (1-0) LP: Andy Ashby (0-1); Home runs: SD: None; NYY: Bernie Williams (1), Jorge Posada (1)

In Game 2, the Bombers took a big early lead, thanks to a dreadful outing by San Diego starter Andy Ashby. Bernie Williams and Jorge Posada hit home runs to assist the Yankees on offense. New York started Cuban import, Orlando Hernández, who was outstanding.

=== Game 3 ===
October 20, 1998, at Qualcomm Stadium in San Diego, California

Team	1	2	3	4	5	6	7	8	9	R	H	E
New York	0	0	0	0	0	0	2	3	0	5	9	1
San Diego	0	0	0	0	0	3	0	1	0	4	7	1
WP: Ramiro Mendoza (1-0) LP: Trevor Hoffman (0-1) Sv: Mariano Rivera (2); Home runs: NYY: Scott Brosius 2 (2); SD: None

With the Yankees up 2–0, they sent David Cone to the mound to face former Yankee pitcher, Sterling Hitchcock, the MVP of the NLCS. Both teams were kept off the scoreboard until the bottom of the 6th when Hitchcock himself led off the inning with a single off Cone. He and Qulivio Veras both scored two batters later when Tony Gwynn shot a double down the line past Tino Martinez at first base. Gwynn also scored in the inning to give San Diego a 3–0 lead. However, a half inning later the Yanks jumped on Hitchcock for two runs beginning with a home run to left-center by Scott Brosius. The second run came in after Shane Spencer doubled and scored on an error by Ken Caminiti. In the 8th, the call was made to Trevor Hoffman after Randy Myers walked Paul O'Neill to open the inning. Hoffman then walked Tino Martinez before Scott Brosius tagged a three-run blast over the fence in dead center. With a 5–3 lead, the Yankees wrapped up the victory when Mariano Rivera picked up the save in the 9th to end it.

=== Game 4 ===
October 21, 1998, at Qualcomm Stadium in San Diego, California

Team	1	2	3	4	5	6	7	8	9	R	H	E
New York	0	0	0	0	0	1	0	2	0	3	9	0
San Diego	0	0	0	0	0	0	0	0	0	0	7	0
WP: Andy Pettitte (1-0) LP: Kevin Brown (0-1) Sv: Mariano Rivera (3)

New York's Andy Pettitte outpitched San Diego's Kevin Brown with 7 1/3 strong innings for the 3-0 Yankees victory, giving the Bombers their 24th title. Though New York's reliever Jeff Nelson allowed the Padres to load the bases, Mariano Rivera came in to end the threat by getting Jim Leyritz, known for his clutch postseason homers with San Diego, to fly out. Rivera added another scoreless inning for the save.

== Farm system ==
Level	Team	League	Manager
AAA	Las Vegas Stars	Pacific Coast League	Jerry Royster
AA	Mobile BayBears	Southern League	Mike Ramsey
A	Rancho Cucamonga Quakes	California League	Carlos Lezcano
A	Clinton LumberKings	Midwest League	Tom LeVasseur
Rookie	AZL Padres	Arizona League	Randy Whisler
Rookie	Idaho Falls Braves	Pioneer League	Don Werner

LEAGUE CHAMPIONS: Mobile, Idaho Falls
