= 1998 National League Championship Series =

Team (Wins)	Managers	Season
San Diego Padres (4)	Bruce Bochy	98–64 (.605), GA: 9 1/2
Atlanta Braves (2)	Bobby Cox	106–56 (.654), GA: 18
- Dates: October 7–14
- MVP: Sterling Hitchcock (San Diego)
- Umpires: Terry Tata, Larry Poncino, Tom Hallion, Greg Bonin, Gerry Davis, Steve Rippley

Broadcast
- Television: Fox
- TV announcers: Joe Buck, Tim McCarver, and Bob Brenly
- Radio: ESPN
- Radio announcers: Charley Steiner and Kevin Kennedy
- NLDS: Atlanta Braves over Chicago Cubs (3–0); San Diego Padres over Houston Astros (3–1)

The 1998 National League Championship Series (NLCS) was a best-of-seven playoff series in Major League Baseball's 1998 postseason pitting the top-seeded Atlanta Braves and the third-seeded San Diego Padres for the National League pennant. The Series began on October 7 and ended on October 14. The Braves held home field advantage, which for the first time was determined by virtue of having a better regular season record.

The Padres defeated the Braves four games to two, but would go on to the lose to the New York Yankees in the World Series in a four-game sweep.

This was the last NLCS trip for the Padres until 2022, while 1998 still represents their last NLCS victory.

== Background ==
The Braves entered the playoffs for the seventh straight season with a franchise-record 106 regular season wins, an offense that hit 215 home runs, and a pitching staff made up of Greg Maddux, Tom Glavine, John Smoltz, Denny Neagle, and Kevin Millwood. The lowest win total for any of these five pitchers was Neagle at 16–11, with the other four winning 17, 17, 18, and 20 respectively. However, they also carried the baggage of their embarrassing NLCS loss to the Florida Marlins the previous season. In the NLDS, the Braves swept Sammy Sosa and the Chicago Cubs.

After a 76–86 season in 1997, San Diego stormed out and took control of their division, finishing with a 98–64 record, their best in team history. The offense was led by the 50 home run club's newest member, Greg Vaughn, and by Hall of Famer Tony Gwynn. The San Diego rotation was anchored by 18-game winner Kevin Brown, who helped Florida defeat Atlanta in the 1997 NLCS, along with All-Star Andy Ashby and the eventual series MVP Sterling Hitchcock. Closer Trevor Hoffman saved an astounding 53 games in the regular season. The Padres defeated the favored Houston Astros in four games in the NLDS to advance to the NLCS for the first time since 1984.

It was the seventh-consecutive NLCS appearance for the Braves and they were heavily favored against the Padres, though their edge in the season series between the two teams was modest, having won the regular season series, 5–4.

== Summary ==
=== Atlanta Braves vs. San Diego Padres ===
San Diego won the series, 4–2.

Game	Date	Score	Location	Time	Attendance
1	October 7	San Diego Padres – 3, Atlanta Braves – 2 (10)	Turner Field	3:27	42,117
2	October 8	San Diego Padres – 3, Atlanta Braves – 0	Turner Field	2:54	43,083
3	October 10	Atlanta Braves – 1, San Diego Padres – 4	Qualcomm Stadium	3:00	62,799
4	October 11	Atlanta Braves – 8, San Diego Padres – 3	Qualcomm Stadium	2:58	65,042
5	October 12	Atlanta Braves – 7, San Diego Padres – 6	Qualcomm Stadium	3:17	58,988
6	October 14	San Diego Padres – 5, Atlanta Braves – 0	Turner Field	3:10	50,988

== Game summaries ==
=== Game 1 ===
October 7, 1998 10:16 pm (EDT) at Turner Field in Atlanta, Georgia 74 °F (23 °C), overcast
Team	1	2	3	4	5	6	7	8	9	10	R	H	E
San Diego	0	0	0	0	1	0	0	1	0	1	3	7	0
Atlanta	0	0	1	0	0	0	0	0	1	0	2	8	3
WP: Trevor Hoffman (1–0) LP: Kerry Ligtenberg (0–1) Sv: Donne Wall (1); Home runs: SD: Ken Caminiti (1); ATL: Andruw Jones (1); Attendance: 42,117; Boxscore

This game had a two-hour rain delay, starting the game at 10:16 p.m. EDT, instead of the planned 8:15 p.m. EDT.

With John Smoltz on the mound, the Braves struck first when Andruw Jones hit a home run to lead off the third inning off Andy Ashby. The Padres tied the game in the fifth when Tony Gwynn, appearing in his first NLCS since 1984, hit an RBI single with two on. Ruben Rivera doubled to lead off the eighth, then an error by first baseman Andrés Galarraga on Jim Leyritz's ground ball off of Dennis Martinez helped San Diego take a 2–1 lead. In the bottom half of the inning, closer Trevor Hoffman came into the game early to end a Braves' scoring threat. However, in the ninth, the Braves got the tying run off him when Ryan Klesko, walked, moved to third on a single and scored on a sacrifice fly by Jones. In the tenth, Ken Caminiti belted a home run off reliever Kerry Ligtenberg to give San Diego their winning margin. The Braves put two men on via walks in the bottom of the inning, but Galarraga flew out to end the game.

=== Game 2 ===
October 8, 1998 8:15 pm (EDT) at Turner Field in Atlanta, Georgia 62 °F (17 °C), clear
Team	1	2	3	4	5	6	7	8	9	R	H	E
San Diego	0	0	0	0	0	1	0	0	2	3	11	0
Atlanta	0	0	0	0	0	0	0	0	0	0	3	1
WP: Kevin Brown (1–0) LP: Tom Glavine (0–1); Attendance: 43,083; Boxscore

After the tightly-contested Game 1, Kevin Brown, who was developing a reputation as a "Brave killer" pitched a three-hit shutout with 11 strikeouts. Tom Glavine matched Brown until the sixth, when San Diego hit three straight two-out singles, the last of which by Quilvio Veras brought in a run. San Diego added two insurance runs in the ninth off of Odalis Perez. Back-to-back leadoff singles and an error by catcher Javy Lopez put runners on first and third. Steve Finley's RBI single scored a run. Then one out later with the bases loaded, Wally Joyner's RBI single scored another before Brown pitched a perfect ninth and put the Braves down two games to none.

=== Game 3 ===
October 10, 1998 1:15 pm (PDT) at Qualcomm Stadium in San Diego, California 72 °F (22 °C), sunny
Team	1	2	3	4	5	6	7	8	9	R	H	E
Atlanta	0	0	1	0	0	0	0	0	0	1	8	2
San Diego	0	0	0	0	2	0	0	2	X	4	7	0
WP: Sterling Hitchcock (1–0) LP: Greg Maddux (0–1) Sv: Trevor Hoffman (1); Attendance: 62,799; Boxscore

The Braves offense was held quiet again as San Diego won Game 3 and took a commanding 3–0 series lead. This was the only game won by the home team. Atlanta sent Greg Maddux to the hill and the Braves struck first in the third when Tony Graffanino drew a leadoff walk, moved to second on Maddux's sacrifice bunt and scored on Walt Weiss's single, but in the fifth, Sterling Hitchcock singled with one out, then one out later, scored on Steve Finley's double to tie the game. After an intentional walk, Ken Caminiti's RBI single put the Padres up 2–1. The Braves loaded the bases in the sixth with one out, but Donne Wall struck out Michael Tucker and Greg Colbrunn to end the threat. The Braves also loaded the bases in the eighth with one out, but again failed to score. In the bottom of the inning, Wally Joyner walked with two outs off of Rudy Seanez, then scored on Carlos Hernández's double. Hernandez advanced to third on an error and scored on passed ball that padded the Padres' lead to 4–1. Trevor Hoffman struck out the side in the ninth and San Diego took Game 3 by a score of 4–1. Starter Sterling Hitchcock got the win with five innings pitched and one run allowed. Atlanta now appeared to be in an insurmountable hole—no team had ever come back from a three games to none deficit in baseball history. This was the last home postseason victory for the Padres until Game 2 of the 2020 National League Wild Card Series.

=== Game 4 ===
October 11, 1998 4:15 pm (PDT) at Qualcomm Stadium in San Diego, California 73 °F (23 °C), sunny
Team	1	2	3	4	5	6	7	8	9	R	H	E
Atlanta	0	0	0	1	0	1	6	0	0	8	12	0
San Diego	0	0	2	0	0	1	0	0	0	3	8	0
WP: Dennis Martínez (1–0) LP: Joey Hamilton (0–1); Home runs: ATL: Javy López (1), Andrés Galarraga (1); SD: Jim Leyritz (1); Attendance: 65,042; Boxscore

San Diego was looking for a sweep and took the first step by taking a 2–0 lead in the third. Quilvio Veras walked with one out off of Denny Neagle, then scored on Tony Gwynn's double. After a single, Gwynn scored on Jim Leyritz's single. The Braves cut the lead to 2–1 when Keith Lockhart hit a leadoff triple and scored on Chipper Jones's single, then tied it in sixth on when Jones doubled with two outs and after a walk, scored on a Ryan Klesko RBI single, but San Diego retook the lead in the bottom of the inning when Jim Leyritz, two years removed from his crucial home run against the Braves in the 1996 World Series, hit a shot off Neagle. The Braves would refuse to go quietly, exploding for six runs in the seventh inning. Javy López led off with a home run, followed by an Andruw Jones single that ended the night for Padres starter Joey Hamilton. Jones moved to second on Randy Myers's wild pitch, then to third on a groundout before scoring on Ozzie Guillén's single to put the Braves up 4–3. A single and walk loaded the bases Dan Miceli relieved Myers and Andrés Galarraga launched a prodigious grand slam that left Atlanta ahead 8–3. The Braves, who used six pitchers in the win, avoided the sweep. They also became the first team since the 1970 Cincinnati Reds to win a post-season game after being down 3 games to none in the series, and the first to do it in a League Championship Series. It had been done three previous times in a World Series (1910, 1937, and 1970), and all of those teams had subsequently lost Game 5.

=== Game 5 ===
October 12, 1998 5:10 pm (PDT) at Qualcomm Stadium in San Diego, California 72 °F (22 °C), cloudy
Team	1	2	3	4	5	6	7	8	9	R	H	E
Atlanta	0	0	0	1	0	1	0	5	0	7	14	1
San Diego	2	0	0	0	0	2	0	0	2	6	10	1
WP: John Rocker (1–0) LP: Kevin Brown (1–1) Sv: Greg Maddux (1); Home runs: ATL: Michael Tucker (1); SD: Ken Caminiti (2), John Vander Wal (1), Greg Myers (1); Attendance: 58,988; Boxscore

After Atlanta's offensive outburst in Game 4 to stay alive, the Padres hoped to close out the Braves in front of their home fans in Game 5. They sent Andy Ashby to the hill against Atlanta starter John Smoltz. Ken Caminiti got things started with a two-run homer off Smoltz to give San Diego a first inning lead. Three consecutive one-out singles in the fourth cut the lead to 2–1. Andruw Jones, who was caught stealing home in the fourth, stole second base in the fifth after singling with two outs, allowing himself to score on a Michael Tucker single to tie the game 2–2. However, John Vander Wal, who had five home runs all year, hit a two-run home run off Smoltz in the bottom of the inning after a two-out single that put San Diego back on top 4–2. After a single by Ozzie Guillén to start the seventh, manager Bruce Bochy brought starter Kevin Brown into the game. Brown retired the first three Braves he faced. The Padres threatened in the bottom of the seventh, but John Rocker came in for Smoltz and retired Tony Gwynn. Still holding a 4–2 lead, Brown was set to pitch the eighth for San Diego. He allowed the first two batters to reach but got Andruw Jones to pop out, bringing the Padres five outs away from a championship. Then Michael Tucker got a hold of a Brown fastball and launched a flyball to deep right center field that left the park and put Atlanta ahead 5–4. Bochy got Brown out of the game, replacing him with Donne Wall, who walked Rocker, then one out later, Tony Graffanino doubled, scoring another run, then crossed home himself when Chris Gomez committed a throwing error on the relay. Behind 7–4 and stunned, the Padres attempted to rally in the ninth. Greg Myers belted a pinch-hit two-run homer with no one out off of Kerry Ligtenberg to make it 7–6, prompting Bobby Cox to bring in Greg Maddux in relief. Maddux retired the side, with nemesis Tony Gwynn grounding out to finish the game, and earned his first ever career save. The save would be the only save in Maddux's career. This wild game cut San Diego's series lead to one game, and with the series returning to Atlanta with Tom Glavine set to pitch, many believed that the Braves had a serious chance of coming back. This Braves win marked the first time in baseball history that a team had come back from a three games to none (in a best of seven series) deficit to reach a Game 6.

=== Game 6 ===
October 14, 1998 4:19 pm (EDT) at Turner Field in Atlanta, Georgia 77 °F (25 °C), sunny
Team	1	2	3	4	5	6	7	8	9	R	H	E
San Diego	0	0	0	0	0	5	0	0	0	5	10	0
Atlanta	0	0	0	0	0	0	0	0	0	0	2	1
WP: Sterling Hitchcock (2–0) LP: Tom Glavine (0–2); Attendance: 50,988; Boxscore

After Kevin Brown's disastrous outing in Game 5, he was unable to come back for Game 6, forcing the Padres to instead start Sterling Hitchcock, who had won game 3, but would pitch on short rest. The Braves had become the first team to force a Game 6 after dropping the first three games, and now had only to do what had been done many times before—win the final two at home. They had the right pitchers to accomplish this, giving themselves the best shot any team could have, but Hitchcock pitched five scoreless innings with eight strikeouts. Glavine looked good as well, matching Hitchcock zero for zero through that point, but ran into trouble in the sixth (the same inning that had doomed him in Game 6 exactly a year to the day prior against the Florida Marlins). After back-to-back one-out singles put runners on first and third, Jim Leyritz had an RBI groundout that scored the first run before Wally Joyner added a single that made it 2–0. A single and walk loaded the bases before Sterling Hitchcock reached on a costly error by left fielder Danny Bautista that scored two more runs. Glavine left the game and John Rocker promptly gave up an RBI single to Quilvio Veras. The unearned runs made it 5–0 and the San Diego bullpen would pitch a hitless final four innings. The Braves only managed two hits the entire game. Hitchcock, who won two games, was named the series MVP. It was their first pennant since 1984. To date, this is the Padres' most recent pennant.

== Composite box ==
1998 NLCS (4–2): San Diego Padres over Atlanta Braves

Team	1	2	3	4	5	6	7	8	9	10	R	H	E
San Diego Padres	2	0	2	0	3	9	0	3	4	1	24	53	1
Atlanta Braves	0	0	2	2	0	2	6	5	1	0	18	47	8
Total attendance: 323,017 Average attendance: 53,836
