= 1998 Chicago Cubs season =

1998 Chicago Cubs
- National League Wild Card winners
- League: National League
- Division: Central
- Ballpark: Wrigley Field
- City: Chicago
- Record: 90–73 (.552)
- Divisional place: 2nd
- Owners: Tribune Company
- General managers: Ed Lynch
- Managers: Jim Riggleman
- Television: WGN-TV/Superstation WGN/Chicagoland TV (Chip Caray, Steve Stone)
- Radio: WGN (Pat Hughes, Ron Santo)
- Stats: ESPN.com; Baseball Reference

The 1998 Chicago Cubs season was the 127th season of the Chicago Cubs franchise, the 123rd in the National League and the 83rd at Wrigley Field. The Cubs finished second in the National League Central with a record of 90–73.

The season was a significant one for the team for several reasons. Firstly, it saw the Cubs reach the playoffs for the first time since 1989 by way of a Wild Card berth, which they clinched after winning a one-game playoff against the San Francisco Giants. The Cubs, however, would lose the NLDS in a 3–0 sweep by the Atlanta Braves. The season also saw Sammy Sosa, along with Mark McGwire, surpass the existing single-season home run record of 61. Sosa would hold the home run lead at several points over the course of the season, eventually finishing four homers behind McGwire (66 and 70 respectively). The 1998 season also saw the debut of Kerry Wood, who drew immediate national attention because of a 20-strikeout performance in his fifth career start, a 13–6 record over 26 starts, and more than 12 strikeouts per nine innings pitched.

== Offseason ==
=== Harry Caray ===
On February 18, 1998, Cubs broadcaster Harry Caray died. Caray had the benefit of being in the booth during the NL East title run in 1984, when being a Cub fan became more popular to Chicagoans. His trademark call of "Holy Cow!" and his singing of "Take me out to the ballgame" during the 7th inning stretch made Caray a fan favorite both locally and, thanks to WGN's superstation status, on a national level as well.

The Cubs still have a live singer, usually a celebrity, during the 7th inning stretch to honor Caray's memory to this day. Caray is also honored with a statue located at the corner of Sheffield and Addison streets, and during the 1998 season, a patch with Caray's caricature and Brickhouse's trademark "Hey Hey" were worn on the players sleeves to honor the passing of both commentators within a span of a few months. Harry's popularity also led to his grandson Chip Caray joining the broadcast team in winter of 1997, shortly before Harry's death.

=== Notable transactions ===
- November 18, 1997: Brooks Kieschnick was drafted by the Tampa Bay Devil Rays from the Chicago Cubs as the 64th pick in the 1997 expansion draft.

== Regular season ==
- May 6, 1998 – Cubs pitcher Kerry Wood struck out 20 Houston Astros tying the major league record and setting a new National League record. Wood accomplished this feat in only his fifth major league start.
- September 8, 1998 – Cubs pitcher Steve Trachsel gave up Mark McGwire's 62nd home run of the season. The home run would break the record set by Roger Maris for most home runs in a season.
- September 13, 1998 – Sammy Sosa hits home runs number 61 and 62 tying McGwire in the home run race in the Cubs 11–10 win over Milwaukee.
- September 23, 1998 – In a tie with the New York Mets for the lead in the NL Wild Card standings with three games remaining, the Cubs held a 7–5 lead in the bottom of the 9th inning in a crucial game against the Milwaukee Brewers, but the Brewers had the bases loaded with two out. Closer Rod Beck delivered to Geoff Jenkins, and he hit an easy fly ball to left fielder Brant Brown. But Brown dropped the ball and it skipped past him. This error allowed three runs to score, including the winning run, and the Brewers pulled off an 8–7 victory.

In the final game of the season, with the Cubs and Giants tied for the Wild Card lead, a Terry Mulholland throwing error cost the Cubs a victory against the Houston Astros, as San Francisco held an early lead in Colorado, and the team's playoff hopes were in jeopardy. However, a Neifi Pérez walk-off home run gave the Rockies a win and forced a one-game playoff at Wrigley Field.

=== Notable transactions ===
- July 6, 1998: Glenallen Hill was selected off waivers by the Chicago Cubs from the Seattle Mariners.
- August 3, 1998: Gary Gaetti was claimed off waivers by the Chicago Cubs from the St. Louis Cardinals.

=== Season standings ===
NL Central
Team	W	L	Pct.	GB	Home	Road
Houston Astros	102	60	.630	—	55‍–‍26	47‍–‍34
Chicago Cubs	90	73	.552	12½	51‍–‍31	39‍–‍42
St. Louis Cardinals	83	79	.512	19	48‍–‍34	35‍–‍45
Cincinnati Reds	77	85	.475	25	39‍–‍42	38‍–‍43
Milwaukee Brewers	74	88	.457	28	38‍–‍43	36‍–‍45
Pittsburgh Pirates	69	93	.426	33	40‍–‍40	29‍–‍53

=== Record vs. opponents ===
1998 National League record Source: MLB Standings Grid – 1998
Team	AZ	ATL	CHC	CIN	COL	FLA	HOU	LAD	MIL	MON	NYM	PHI	PIT	SD	SF	STL	AL
Arizona	—	1–8	5–7	4–5	6–6	6–2	4–5	4–8	6–3	2–7	4–5	2–7	6–3	3–9	5–7	2–7	5–8
Atlanta	8–1	—	3–6	7–2	5–3	7–5	4–5	8–1	7–2	6–6	9–3	8–4	7–2	5–4	7–2	6–3	9–7
Chicago	7–5	6–3	—	6–5	7–2	7–2	4–7	4–5	6–6	7–2	4–5	3–6	8–3	5–4	7–3	4–7	5–8
Cincinnati	5–4	2–7	5–6	—	4–5	9–0	3–8	5–4	6–5	8–1	3–6	4–5	5–7	1–11	2–7	8–3	7-6
Colorado	6–6	3–5	2–7	5–4	—	6–3	6–5	6–6	4–7	7–2	3–6	5–4	5–4	5–7	7–5	3–6	4–8
Florida	2–6	5–7	2–7	0–9	3–6	—	3–6	4–5	0–9	5–7	5–7	6–6	3–6	4–5	0–9	4–5	8–8
Houston	5–4	5–4	7–4	8–3	5–6	6–3	—	3–6	9–2	7–2	5–4	7–2	9–2	5–4	6–3	5–7	10–4
Los Angeles	8–4	1–8	5–4	4–5	6–6	5–4	6–3	—	5–4	5–4	3–5	5–4	7–5	5–7	6–6	4–5	8–5
Milwaukee	3–6	2–7	6–6	5–6	7–4	9–0	2–9	4–5	—	6–3	1–8	4–5	6–5	3–6	5–4	3–8	8–6
Montreal	7–2	6–6	2–7	1–8	2–7	7–5	2–7	4–5	3–6	—	8–4	5–7	2–7	4–4	3–6	3–6	6–10
New York	5–4	3–9	5–4	6–3	6–3	7–5	4–5	5–3	8–1	4–8	—	8–4	4–5	4–5	4–5	6–3	9–7
Philadelphia	7–2	4–8	6–3	5–4	4–5	6–6	2–7	4–5	5–4	7–5	4–8	—	8–1	1–8	2–6	3–6	7–9
Pittsburgh	3–6	2–7	3–8	7–5	4–5	6–3	2–9	5–7	5–6	7–2	5–4	1–8	—	5–4	2–7	6–5	6–7
San Diego	9–3	4–5	4–5	11–1	7–5	5–4	4–5	7–5	6–3	4–4	5–4	8–1	4–5	—	8–4	6–3	6–7
San Francisco	7–5	2–7	3–7	7–2	5–7	9–0	3–6	6–6	4–5	6–3	5–4	6–2	7–2	4–8	—	7–5	8–5
St. Louis	7–2	3–6	7–4	3–8	6–3	5-4	7–5	5–4	8–3	6–3	3–6	6–3	5–6	3–6	5–7	—	4–9

=== Roster ===
1998 Chicago Cubs
Roster
Pitchers: 51 Terry Adams; 47 Rod Beck; 54 Mark Clark; 44 Tony Fossas; 31 Kevin Foster; 30 Geremi González; 44 Chris Haney; 49 Félix Heredia; 52 Matt Karchner; 53 Kurt Miller; 38 Mike Morgan; 45 Terry Mulholland; 59 Rodney Myers; 35 Bob Patterson; 41 Marc Pisciotta; 56 Justin Speier; 49 Kennie Steenstra; 48 Dave Stevens; 36 Kevin Tapani; 44 Amaury Telemaco; 46 Steve Trachsel; 58 Ben Van Ryn; 33 Don Wengert; 34 Kerry Wood	Catchers: 7 Tyler Houston; 8,15 Sandy Martínez; 9 Scott Servais; Infielders: 24 Manny Alexander; 4 Jeff Blauser; 8,15 Gary Gaetti; 17 Mark Grace; 19 Jason Hardtke; 18 José Hernández; 50 Jason Maxwell; 12 Mickey Morandini; 11 José Nieves; 15 Kevin Orie	Outfielders: 37 Brant Brown; 6 Glenallen Hill; 1 Lance Johnson; 10 Terrell Lowery; 25 Orlando Merced; 20 Matt Mieske; 40 Henry Rodríguez; 21 Sammy Sosa; 28 Pedro Valdés; 25 Derrick White	Manager: 5 Jim Riggleman; Coaches: 43 Dave Bialas (bullpen); 39 Tom Gamboa (third base); 2 Jeff Pentland (hitting); 3 Dan Radison (first base); 27 Phil Regan (pitching); 26 Billy Williams (bench)

=== Sammy Sosa's 66 home runs ===
Number	Date	Pitcher	Length
1	April 4, 1998	Marc Valdes	371'
2	04-11-1998	Anthony Telford	350'
3	04-15-1998	Dennis Cook	430'
4	04-23-1998	Dan Miceli	420'
5	04-24-1998	Ismael Valdez	430'
6	04-27-1998	Joey Hamilton	434'
7	05-03-1998	Cliff Politte	370'
8	05-16-1998	Scott Sullivan	441'
9	05-22-1998	Greg Maddux	440'
10	05-25-1998	Kevin Millwood	410'
11	05-25-1998	Mike Cather	420'
12	05-27-1998	Darrin Winston	460'
13	05-27-1998	Wayne Gomes	400'
14	06-01-1998	Ryan Dempster	430'
15	06-01-1998	Oscar Henriquez	410'
16	06-03-1998	Liván Hernández	370'
17	06-05-1998	Jim Parque	370'
18	06-06-1998	Carlos Castillo	410'
19	06-07-1998	James Baldwin	380'
20	06-08-1998	LaTroy Hawkins	340'
21	06-13-1998	Mark Portugal	410'
22	06-15-1998	Cal Eldred	420'
23	06-15-1998	Cal Eldred	410'
24	06-15-1998	Cal Eldred	415'
25	06-17-1998	Bronswell Patrick	430'
26	06-19-1998	Carlton Loewer	380'
27	06-19-1998	Carlton Loewer	380'
28	06-20-1998	Matt Beech	366'
29	06-20-1998	Toby Borland	500'
30	06-21-1998	Tyler Green	380'
31	06-24-1998	Seth Greisinger	390'
32	06-25-1998	Brian Moehler	400'
33	06-30-1998	Alan Embree	364'
34	07-09-1998	Jeff Juden	432'
35	07-10-1998	Scott Karl	428'
36	07-17-1998	Kirt Ojala	440'
37	07-22-1998	Miguel Batista	365'
38	07-26-1998	Rick Reed	420'
39	07-27-1998	Willie Blair	347'
40	07-27-1998	Alan Embree	438'
41	07-28-1998	Bob Wolcott	390'
42	07-31-1998	Jamey Wright	375'
43	08-05-1998	Andy Benes	374'
44	08-08-1998	Rich Croushore	400'
45	08-10-1998	Russ Ortiz	361'
46	08-10-1998	Chris Brock	480'
47	08-16-1998	Sean Bergman	360'
48	08-19-1998	Kent Bottenfield	368'
49	08-21-1998	Orel Hershiser	430'
50	08-23-1998	José Lima	440'
51	08-23-1998	José Lima	380'
52	08-26-1998	Brett Tomko	438'
53	08-28-1998	John Thomson	414'
54	08-30-1998	Darryl Kile	482'
55	08-31-1998	Brett Tomko	364'
56	09-02-1998	Jason Bere	363'
57	09-04-1998	Jason Schmidt	374'
58	09-05-1998	Sean Lawrence	417'
59	09-11-1998	Bill Pulsipher	464'
60	09-12-1998	Valerio de los Santos	430'
61	09-13-1998	Bronswell Patrick	480'
62	09-13-1998	Eric Plunk	480'
63	09-16-1998	Brian Boehringer	434'
64	09-23-1998	Rafael Roque	344'
65	09-23-1998	Rod Henderson	410'
66	09-25-1998	José Lima	462'

== Player stats ==
=== Batting ===
==== Starters by position ====
Note: Pos = Position; G = Games played; AB = At bats; H = Hits; Avg. = Batting average; HR = Home runs; RBI = Runs batted in

Pos	Player	G	AB	H	Avg.	HR	RBI
C	Scott Servais	113	325	72	.222	7	36
1B	Mark Grace	158	595	184	.309	17	89
2B	Mickey Morandini	154	582	172	.296	8	53
SS	Jeff Blauser	119	361	79	.219	4	26
3B	José Hernández	149	488	124	.254	23	75
LF	Henry Rodríguez	128	415	104	.251	31	85
CF	Lance Johnson	85	304	85	.280	2	21
RF	Sammy Sosa	159	643	198	.308	66	158

==== Other batters ====
Note: G = Games played; AB = At bats; H = Hits; Avg. = Batting average; HR = Home runs; RBI = Runs batted in

Player	G	AB	H	Avg.	HR	RBI
Brant Brown	124	347	101	.291	14	48
Manny Alexander	108	264	60	.227	5	25
Tyler Houston	95	255	65	.255	9	33
Kevin Orie	64	204	37	.181	2	21
Glenallen Hill	48	131	46	.351	8	23
Gary Gaetti	37	128	41	.320	8	27
Matt Mieske	77	97	29	.299	1	12
Sandy Martínez	45	87	23	.264	0	7
Pedro Valdés	14	23	5	.217	0	2
Jason Hardtke	18	21	5	.238	0	2
Terrell Lowery	24	15	3	.200	0	1
Orlando Merced	12	10	3	.300	1	5
Derrick White	11	10	1	.100	1	2
Jason Maxwell	7	3	1	.333	1	2
José Nieves	2	1	0	.000	0	0

=== Pitching ===
==== Starting pitchers ====
Note: G = Games pitched; IP = Innings pitched; W = Wins; L = Losses; ERA = Earned run average; SO = Strikeouts

Player	G	IP	W	L	ERA	SO
Kevin Tapani	35	219.0	19	9	4.85	139
Mark Clark	33	213.2	9	14	4.84	161
Steve Trachsel	33	208.0	15	8	4.46	149
Kerry Wood	26	166.2	13	6	3.40	233
Geremi González	20	110.0	7	7	5.32	70
Mike Morgan	5	22.2	0	1	7.15	10

==== Other pitchers ====
Note: G = Games pitched; IP = Innings pitched; W = Wins; L = Losses; ERA = Earned run average; SO = Strikeouts

Player	G	IP	W	L	ERA	SO
Don Wengert	21	49.2	1	5	5.07	41

==== Relief pitchers ====
Note: G = Games pitched; W = Wins; L = Losses; SV = Saves; ERA = Earned run average; SO = Strikeouts

Player	G	W	L	SV	ERA	SO
Rod Beck	81	3	4	51	3.02	81
Terry Mulholland	70	6	5	3	2.89	72
Terry Adams	63	7	7	1	4.33	73
Marc Pisciotta	43	1	2	0	4.09	31
Bob Patterson	33	1	1	1	7.52	17
Dave Stevens	31	1	2	0	4.74	31
Félix Heredia	30	3	0	0	4.08	16
Matt Karchner	29	3	1	0	5.14	22
Amaury Telemaco	14	1	1	0	3.90	18
Rodney Myers	12	0	0	0	7.00	15
Ben Van Ryn	9	0	0	0	3.38	6
Tony Fossas	8	0	0	0	9.00	6
Chris Haney	5	0	0	0	7.20	4
Kennie Steenstra	4	0	0	0	10.80	4
Kurt Miller	3	0	0	0	0.00	6
Kevin Foster	3	0	0	0	16.20	3
Justin Speier	1	0	0	0	13.50	2

== Postseason ==
=== Wild Card tie-breaker game ===
One-game playoff to break tie in regular season standings

Chicago Cubs 5, San Francisco Giants 3 (Wrigley Field)

=== Division Series ===
NL Division Series (Best of 5)

Atlanta Braves 7, Chicago Cubs 1 (Turner Field)
Atlanta Braves 2, Chicago Cubs 1 (Turner Field)
Atlanta Braves 6, Chicago Cubs 2 (Wrigley Field)

Braves win series 3–0

== Awards and honors ==
- Sammy Sosa, National League Most Valuable Player
- Sammy Sosa, Outfield, Roberto Clemente Award
- Sammy Sosa, Franchise Record, Most Home Runs in One Season
- Sammy Sosa, National League Record, Fewest Triples in One Season with 600 or more At-Bats (0)
- Kerry Wood, National League Rookie of the Year

All-Star Game

== Farm system ==
Level	Team	League	Manager
AAA	Iowa Cubs	Pacific Coast League	Terry Kennedy
AA	West Tenn Diamond Jaxx	Southern League	Dave Trembley
A	Daytona Cubs	Florida State League	Steve Roadcap
A	Rockford Cubbies	Midwest League	Rubén Amaro, Sr.
A-Short Season	Williamsport Cubs	New York–Penn League	Bobby Ralston
Rookie	AZL Cubs	Arizona League	Nate Oliver
