= 1998 National League Division Series =

American baseball games

Teams
Team (Wins)		Manager	Season
Atlanta Braves (3)		Bobby Cox	106–56 (.654), GA: 18
Chicago Cubs (0)		Jim Riggleman	90–73 (.552), GB: 12 1/2
- Dates: September 30–October 3
- Television: ESPN (Game 1); Fox (Game 2); NBC (Game 3)
- TV announcers: Jon Miller and Joe Carter (Game 1); Thom Brennaman and Bob Brenly (Game 2); Bob Costas and Joe Morgan (Game 3)
- Radio: ESPN
- Radio announcers: Gary Cohen and Kevin Kennedy

Teams
Team (Wins)		Manager	Season
San Diego Padres (3)		Bruce Bochy	98–64 (.605), GA: 9 1/2
Houston Astros (1)		Larry Dierker	102–60 (.630), GA: 12 1/2
- Dates: September 29–October 4
- Television: ESPN (Games 1–3); Fox (Game 4)
- TV announcers: Jon Miller and Joe Morgan (Games 1–2); Jon Miller and Ray Knight (Game 3); Thom Brennaman and Bob Brenly (Game 4)
- Radio: ESPN
- Radio announcers: Charley Steiner and Rick Sutcliffe
- Umpires: Mike Winters, Bill Hohn, Jerry Layne, Randy Marsh, Frank Pulli, Wally Bell (Braves–Cubs, Games 1–2; Astros–Padres, Games 3–4); Ed Rapuano, Jeff Kellogg, Gary Darling, Bob Davidson, Bruce Froemming, Ángel Hernández (Astros–Padres, Games 1–2; Braves–Cubs, Game 3)

The 1998 National League Division Series (NLDS), consisted of two best-of-five playoff series on the National League side in Major League Baseball's 1998 postseason, began on Tuesday, September 29, and ended on Sunday, October 4, with the champions of the three NL divisions—along with a "wild card" team—participating in two series.

Under MLB's playoff format, no two teams from the same division were matched up in the Division Series, regardless of whether their records would normally indicate such a matchup. For the first time ever, home field advantage went to the team with the better regular-season record with the exception of the wild card team, which defers home field advantage regardless of record. The matchups were:

- (1) Atlanta Braves (NL East champions) vs. (4) Chicago Cubs (Wild Card qualifier): Braves won the series, 3–0.
- (2) Houston Astros (NL Central champions) vs. (3) San Diego Padres (NL West champions): Padres won the series, 3–1.

Also for the first time, the team with home field advantage (the higher seeded team) in each series hosts Games 1, 2, and 5 (if necessary), and the lower seeded team hosts Games 3 and 4 (if necessary). Prior to 1998, the team with home field advantage in all MLB best-of-five series began on the road for Games 1–2, and hosted Games 3–5 (with Games 4–5 if necessary).

The Braves and Padres went on to meet in the NL Championship Series (NLCS). The Padres defeated the Braves four games to two to become the National League champion, and lost to the American League champion New York Yankees in the 1998 World Series.

== Matchups ==
=== Atlanta Braves vs. Chicago Cubs ===
Atlanta won the series, 3–0.

Game	Date	Score	Location	Time	Attendance
1	September 30	Chicago Cubs – 1, Atlanta Braves – 7	Turner Field	2:34	45,598
2	October 1	Chicago Cubs – 1, Atlanta Braves – 2 (10)	Turner Field	2:47	51,713
3	October 3	Atlanta Braves – 6, Chicago Cubs – 2	Wrigley Field	2:57	39,597

=== Houston Astros vs. San Diego Padres ===
San Diego won the series, 3–1.

Game	Date	Score	Location	Time	Attendance
1	September 29	San Diego Padres – 2, Houston Astros – 1	Astrodome	2:38	50,080
2	October 1	San Diego Padres – 4, Houston Astros – 5	Astrodome	2:53	45,550
3	October 3	Houston Astros – 1, San Diego Padres – 2	Qualcomm Stadium	2:32	65,235
4	October 4	Houston Astros – 1, San Diego Padres – 6	Qualcomm Stadium	2:39	64,898

== Atlanta vs. Chicago ==
=== Game 1 ===
September 30, 1998 4:07 pm (EDT) at Turner Field in Atlanta, Georgia 72 °F (22 °C), overcast
Team	1	2	3	4	5	6	7	8	9	R	H	E
Chicago	0	0	0	0	0	0	0	1	0	1	5	1
Atlanta	0	2	0	0	0	1	4	0	X	7	8	0
WP: John Smoltz (1–0) LP: Mark Clark (0–1); Home runs: CHC: Tyler Houston (1); ATL: Michael Tucker (1), Ryan Klesko (1); Attendance: 45,598; Boxscore

The Braves faced the Chicago Cubs, who made it into the playoffs by beating the San Francisco Giants in a tiebreaker for the Wild Card spot and though the Cubs won the season series 6-3 including a three-game sweep in Wrigley Field without NL MVP Sammy Sosa, and a two-game sweep in Turner Field, the Braves proved that the post season would be different. John Smoltz pitched masterfully and Michael Tucker started the scoring with a two-run home run off Chicago starter Mark Clark. Then an Andruw Jones sacrifice fly with two on made it 3–0. In the bottom of the seventh, Ryan Klesko put the game away with a grand slam into right field off of Matt Karchner after three walks off of Clark (one) and Felix Heredia (two walks). Clark allowed four runs, but two were unearned. The Cubs would score in the eighth off Smoltz on Tyler Houston's lead off home run. This ended Smoltz's night, but John Rocker and Kerry Ligtenberg slammed the door on Game 1.

=== Game 2 ===
October 1, 1998 8:07 pm (EDT) at Turner Field in Atlanta, Georgia 82 °F (28 °C), clear
Team	1	2	3	4	5	6	7	8	9	10	R	H	E
Chicago	0	0	0	0	0	1	0	0	0	0	1	4	1
Atlanta	0	0	0	0	0	0	0	0	1	1	2	6	0
WP: Odalis Pérez (1–0) LP: Terry Mulholland (0–1); Home runs: CHC: None; ATL: Javy López (1); Attendance: 51,713; Boxscore

Game 2 was a pitchers' duel. Kevin Tapani faced Tom Glavine; the pair had previously faced each other in the 1991 World Series. Lance Johnson drove in the lone Chicago run in the top of the sixth on a groundout. However, leaving Tapani in to pitch the ninth ultimately cost the Cubs the game. Javy López hit the game-tying home run and Chipper Jones drove in the winning run in the tenth off Terry Mulholland with an RBI single. Odalis Pérez became the first pitcher in major league history to record his first career win in a postseason game.

=== Game 3 ===
October 3, 1998 6:30 pm (CDT) at Wrigley Field in Chicago, Illinois 51 °F (11 °C), overcast
Team	1	2	3	4	5	6	7	8	9	R	H	E
Atlanta	0	0	1	0	0	0	0	5	0	6	9	0
Chicago	0	0	0	0	0	0	0	2	0	2	8	2
WP: Greg Maddux (1–0) LP: Kerry Wood (0–1); Home runs: ATL: Eddie Pérez (1); CHC: None; Attendance: 39,597; Boxscore

Game 3 was another pitchers' duel. Greg Maddux faced Rookie of the Year Kerry Wood, hoping to keep the ship afloat for the Cubs. The Braves scored first in the top of the third when Maddux doubled and later scored on a passed ball with two outs. Wood pitched five innings and that was the only run he would allow. Maddux was masterful, carrying a shutout into the bottom of the eighth. In the top of the eighth, Gerald Williams drove in another run with an RBI single off Rod Beck after Terry Mulholland allowed a single and walk. When Andruw Jones was intentionally walked to load the bases, Eddie Pérez belted a grand slam into left field to put the game and the series away. Maddux was lifted after giving up three straight singles in favor in Ligtenberg. Mickey Morandini's sacrifice fly and Mark Graces RBI single made it 6–2 Braves, but Ligtenberg retired the Cubs in order in the ninth. José Hernández flied to center for the final out of the series as the Braves won their first game at Wrigley Field of the season.

=== Composite box ===
1998 NLDS (3–0): Atlanta Braves over Chicago Cubs

Team	1	2	3	4	5	6	7	8	9	10	R	H	E
Atlanta Braves	0	2	1	0	0	1	4	5	1	1	15	23	0
Chicago Cubs	0	0	0	0	0	1	0	3	0	0	4	17	4
Total attendance: 136,908 Average attendance: 45,636

== Houston vs. San Diego ==
=== Game 1 ===
September 29, 1998 3:07 pm (CDT) at Astrodome in Houston, Texas 72 °F (22 °C), dome
Team	1	2	3	4	5	6	7	8	9	R	H	E
San Diego	0	0	0	0	0	1	0	1	0	2	9	1
Houston	0	0	0	0	0	0	0	0	1	1	4	0
WP: Kevin Brown (1–0) LP: Randy Johnson (0–1) Sv: Trevor Hoffman (1); Home runs: SD: Greg Vaughn (1); HOU: None; Attendance: 50,080; Boxscore

The Astros entered the playoffs with the league's best offense and red-hot pitcher Randy Johnson, who had gone 10–1 since being traded to the Astros in a mid-season deadline deal, well rested for Game 1. However, Padres ace Kevin Brown was more than up for the challenge as he set an LDS record striking out 16 Astros in eight innings before turning the game over to all-star closer Trevor Hoffman for the save. The Padres only managed two runs, including a home run by slugger Greg Vaughn. Despite Brown's dominant performance, the game was not without its tense moments thanks to a less than perfect ninth inning. Hoffman, who had tied the NL record for saves with 53, did allow an unearned run on two hits thanks to a throwing error by third baseman Ken Caminiti. The error by the former Astro brought Houston to within one run before Hoffman slammed the door ending the game at 2–1. This was the first road postseason victory for the Padres.

=== Game 2 ===
October 1, 1998 3:07 pm (CDT) at Astrodome in Houston, Texas 72 °F (22 °C), dome
Team	1	2	3	4	5	6	7	8	9	R	H	E
San Diego	0	0	0	0	0	2	0	0	2	4	8	1
Houston	1	0	2	0	0	0	0	1	1	5	11	1
WP: Billy Wagner (1–0) LP: Dan Miceli (0–1); Home runs: SD: Jim Leyritz (1); HOU: Derek Bell (1); Attendance: 45,550; Boxscore

Shane Reynolds pitched a strong seven innings for Houston yielding only two runs and the Astros' offense showed some of its regular season league-leading form by tagging Padres' starter Andy Ashby for three runs and chasing him out of the game after only four innings. Leading 3–2 and looking to give closer Billy Wagner a little more room to work with, the Astros scored again off former Astro Donnie Wall in the bottom of the eighth inning sending Wagner to the hill with 4–2 lead. Armed with a 100 mph fastball, Wagner was 30 for 35 in save opportunities and now had a complement to his fastball in the form of a newly learned slider courtesy of teammate Randy Johnson. Nonetheless, Wagner surrendered a single to 1996 MVP Ken Caminiti, and then a pinch-hit game-tying home run to Jim Leyritz, who had done the same thing as a member of the New York Yankees to Mark Wohlers of the Braves in the 1996 World Series. Unfazed, the Astros led off the bottom of the inning with an infield single by Ricky Gutierrez off Dan Miceli. The Padres countered by bringing in closer Trevor Hoffman. After a sacrifice by catcher Brad Ausmus moved him to second base, Gutierrez stole third uncontested setting up pinch-hitter Bill Spiers to be the game's hero. Spiers delivered with a single off Hoffman and the Astros had their first postseason victory since 1986.

=== Game 3 ===
October 3, 1998 8:07 pm (PDT) at Qualcomm Stadium in San Diego, California 68 °F (20 °C), cloudy
Team	1	2	3	4	5	6	7	8	9	R	H	E
Houston	0	0	0	0	0	0	1	0	0	1	4	0
San Diego	0	0	0	0	0	1	1	0	X	2	3	0
WP: Dan Miceli (1–1) LP: Scott Elarton (0–1) Sv: Trevor Hoffman (2); Home runs: HOU: None; SD: Jim Leyritz (2); Attendance: 65,235; Boxscore

With their Game 1 victory, the Padres had taken home-field advantage away from the favored Astros and San Diego manager Bruce Bochy was determined not to let the momentum turn in Houston's favor after Game 2, so he decided to gamble and started Game 1 starter Kevin Brown on short rest instead of lefty Sterling Hitchcock. The explosive Astros offense, being predominantly right-handed, was especially brutal on left-handed pitchers and a Game 3 win by Houston would have left the Padres facing elimination in Game 4 against Randy Johnson. Brown was opposed by fellow sinkerballer Mike Hampton of the Astros who proved to be Brown's equal. Not nearly the same unhittable master of Game 1, Brown's control was shaky from the beginning as he walked five Astros in seven innings. Still, the Astros were never able to deliver the knock-out blow and managed only one run against Brown, but were still tied going into the bottom of the seventh thanks to a solid six innings of one-run two-hit ball by Mike Hampton. In the bottom of the seventh, Jim Leyritz added yet another chapter to his resume of clutch October heroics with a go-ahead home run off Astros reliever Scott Elarton that gave the Padres a 2–1 lead. Neither team scored again and Trevor Hoffman struck out the side in the top of the ninth for the save.

=== Game 4 ===
October 4, 1998 4:37 pm (PDT) at Qualcomm Stadium in San Diego, California 72 °F (22 °C), sunny
Team	1	2	3	4	5	6	7	8	9	R	H	E
Houston	0	0	0	1	0	0	0	0	0	1	3	1
San Diego	0	1	0	0	0	1	0	4	X	6	7	1
WP: Sterling Hitchcock (1–0) LP: Randy Johnson (0–2); Home runs: HOU: None; SD: Jim Leyritz (3), Wally Joyner (1); Attendance: 64,898; Boxscore

The only game of the series that wasn't decided by one run began with veteran former Cy Young Award winner Randy Johnson squaring off against 27-year-old Sterling Hitchcock who was making his first postseason start. It was Hitchcock, however, that proved dominant by striking out 11 Astros in only six innings of work while Leyritz hit his third home run in as many games to help the Padres to a 2–1 lead. With the Astros' highly touted offense rendered almost completely silent, the bullpen finally collapsed in the eighth inning as Houston pitchers surrendered four runs to the Padres leading to a 6–1 series-clinching victory for San Diego.

=== Composite box ===
1998 NLDS (3–1): San Diego Padres over Houston Astros

Team	1	2	3	4	5	6	7	8	9	R	H	E
San Diego Padres	0	1	0	0	0	5	1	5	2	14	27	3
Houston Astros	1	0	2	1	0	0	1	1	2	8	22	2
Total attendance: 225,763 Average attendance: 56,441
