= Brian Boehringer =

American baseball player (born 1969)

- Pitcher
- Born: January 8, 1969 (age 57); St. Louis, Missouri, U.S.
- Batted: Switch Threw: Right

MLB debut
- April 30, 1995, for the New York Yankees

Last MLB appearance
- June 1, 2004, for the Pittsburgh Pirates

MLB statistics
- Win–loss record: 26–32
- Earned run average: 4.36
- Strikeouts: 432
- Stats at Baseball Reference

Teams
- New York Yankees (1995–1997); San Diego Padres (1998–2000); New York Yankees (2001); San Francisco Giants (2001); Pittsburgh Pirates (2002–2004)

Career highlights and awards
- World Series champion (1996)

Brian Edward Boehringer (born January 8, 1969) is an American former Major League Baseball pitcher. He won the 1996 World Series with the New York Yankees over the Atlanta Braves.

== Early life and career ==
He is a 1987 graduate of Northwest High School in House Springs, Missouri. He attended the University of Nevada, Las Vegas. Boehringer was drafted by the Houston Astros in the tenth round of the MLB draft in 1990, but did not sign. Instead he was drafted by the Chicago White Sox the following year and was traded to the Yankees in 1994.

== Career ==
=== New York Yankees (1995-1997) ===
Boehringer made his major league debut in 1995, going 0–3 with a 13.75 ERA over just seven games. The following year, he went 2–4 with a 5.44 ERA in 33 games. He made two appearances in the 1996 ALDS, winning game two. He made no appearances in the Championship Series, but pitched in two games of the 1996 World Series, to the tune of a 5.40 ERA. He won a World Series ring with the Yankees when they defeated the Atlanta Braves. In 1997, he went 3–2 with a 2.63 ERA and closed 11 games. The Yankees lost him in the 1997 Expansion Draft to the Tampa Bay Devil Rays. The same day, he was traded with Andy Sheets to the San Diego Padres for John Flaherty.

=== San Diego Padres (1998-2000) ===
In his first season with the Padres, Boehringer went 5–2 with a 4.36 ERA. He pitched three scoreless innings in the 1998 NLCS, but gave up two earned runs in the 1998 World Series against the Yankees, losing to them in four games. The next year, he was 6–5 with a 3.24 ERA. In 2000, he was 0–3 with a 5.74 ERA. He became a free agent on October 25 and signed with the Yankees on December 14.

=== Return to the Yankees (2001) ===
Boehringer pitched in 22 games for the Yankees in 2001, going 0–1 with a 3.12 ERA. He was traded to the Giants on July 4 for Bobby Estalella and Joe Smith.

=== San Francisco Giants (2001) ===
Boehringer went 0–3 with a 4.19 ERA in 29 games for the Giants. He was granted free agency on December 21.

=== Pittsburgh Pirates (2002-2004) ===
In 2002, Boehringer was 4–4 with a 3.39 ERA in a career-high 70 games. The following year, he was 5–4 with a 5.49 ERA. He finished his Major League career in 2004 going 1–1 with a 4.62 ERA.

=== Later career (2005-2006) ===
In 2006, Boehringer went 2–4, with a 2.75 ERA with the Omaha Royals. He also played with the Toledo Mud Hens, where he went 3–1, with a 4.83 ERA. He also played for the independent Bridgeport Bluefish of the Atlantic League in 2006 and 2007.

== Post-playing career ==
In 2014, Boehringer was listed as a member of the professional scouting staff of the Arizona Diamondbacks, based in Fenton, Missouri. He also sometimes appears as a guest host on 101.1 FM - ESPN Radio in St. Louis, Missouri.
