= Joey Hamilton =

American baseball player (born 1970)

- Pitcher
- Born: September 9, 1970 (age 55); Statesboro, Georgia, U.S.
- Batted: Right Threw: Right

MLB debut
- May 24, 1994, for the San Diego Padres

Last MLB appearance
- June 6, 2003, for the Cincinnati Reds

MLB statistics
- Win–loss record: 74–73
- Earned run average: 4.44
- Strikeouts: 894
- Stats at Baseball Reference

Teams
- San Diego Padres (1994–1998); Toronto Blue Jays (1999–2001); Cincinnati Reds (2001–2003)
Medals
Men's baseball
Representing United States
Goodwill Games
Bronze medal – third place	1990 Seattle	Team

Johns Joseph Hamilton (born September 9, 1970) is an American former Major League Baseball (MLB) pitcher who played professionally for nine seasons, recording a 74–73 win–loss record, a 4.44 earned run average (ERA) and 894 strikeouts. He attended Statesboro High School in Georgia. Following high school, Hamilton attended Georgia Southern University for three years.

He started his professional career in 1991 when he was drafted by the San Diego Padres, and pitched for three major league teams during his career. As a rookie with San Diego in 1994 he finished fifth in the Major League Baseball Rookie of the Year Award voting for the National League. Following the 1998 season, San Diego traded Hamilton to the Toronto Blue Jays. In 2001, after two seasons with the Blue Jays, he was released. Hamilton signed with the Cincinnati Reds shortly afterward. Hamilton had stints in training camps and the minor leagues with some of the Padres and Reds affiliates. In March 2005, two days after signing with the New York Mets, the team released him.

== Early years and college ==
Hamilton was born on September 9, 1970, in Statesboro, Georgia, to Jack Hamilton and Helen Mathis. He attended Statesboro High School before the Baltimore Orioles drafted him in the 1988 Major League Baseball draft. Hamilton decided against signing with the Orioles, opting instead to play college baseball for Georgia Southern University.

As a sophomore at Georgia Southern in 1990, Hamilton had an 18–4 record with a 3.07 ERA. He was one of nine finalists for the Golden Spikes Award, and he earned Second Team All-American honors from The Sporting News and Baseball America. However, at the beginning of his junior season he went 1–3 with a 7.43 ERA after starting five games. It was soon discovered that Hamilton was suffering from elbow soreness that did not result in surgery.

Hamilton held the Georgia Southern baseball record for appearances, starts, complete games, innings pitched and strikeouts until 1995. He was elected to the Georgia Southern University Athletics Department Hall of Fame in 1997.

"It came as a bit of a shock because I really hadn't heard much from the Padres."

— Joey Hamilton, upon being drafted by the San Diego Padres

The San Diego Padres drafted Hamilton eighth overall in the 1991 Major League Baseball draft, making him the highest drafted Atlantic Sun Conference baseball player in the league's history. He eventually signed a contract with the Padres worth $415,000 after a short period in which Hamilton refused to sign a contract. He was surprised upon hearing of his selection, saying "It came as a bit of a shock because I really hadn't heard much from the Padres." According to Hamilton's mother, Hamilton only signed the deal because his father Jack was dying of cancer, and it had been his father's dream to watch his son pitch in the major leagues. Following the draft, Hamilton joined Team USA in Canada in preparation for the Olympics.

In 1992, Padres general manager Joe McIlvaine stated the Padres would have never selected Hamilton if they knew his agent was Scott Boras. McIlvaine said of the situation, "Basically, he lied to us. We had no idea. That's why half the time, you don't know who he represents. [Scott Boras is] very good at that. His clients are very good about keeping their mouths shut." McIlvaine retracted his comments about Hamilton and Boras after Boras threatened to sue McIlvaine.

== Professional career ==
=== San Diego Padres ===
In 1992, Baseball America ranked him as the top prospect in the San Diego Padres organization and the 36th in Major League Baseball. The Padres sent Hamilton to their Single-A affiliate, the Charleston Rainbows, who were managed by future Baltimore Orioles manager Dave Trembley. With the Rainbows he went 2–2, with a 3.38 ERA in seven games and 34 2/3 innings pitched. He was then called up to the High Desert Mavericks. With High Desert, Hamilton went 4–3 with a 2.74 ERA in nine appearances. Hamilton received one more call-up, this time to Double-A. With the Wichita Wranglers he went 3–0 with a 2.86 ERA in six starts and pitched 34 2/3 innings during his time with the team.

In 1993, Hamilton was ranked as the second best prospect in the Padres organization. He was sent to the Padres' affiliate, the Rancho Cucamonga Quakes. One of Hamilton's teammates with the Quakes was 17-year-old and future All-Star Derrek Lee. During his time with the Quakes, he went 1–0 with a 4.09 ERA in 11 innings during two starts. The Padres then called him up to their Double-A affiliate, the Wichita Wranglers. In Wichita, Hamilton had four wins and nine losses with a 3.97 ERA in 15 starts. After a combined 39 appearances during two seasons, Hamilton was called up to Triple-A Las Vegas. With Las Vegas he went 3–2 with a 4.40 ERA in eight starts.

He made his Major League debut on May 24, 1994. In the game, Hamilton allowed three runs and five hits in six innings but ended up winning the game 6–3 after Phil Clark hit a three–run home run. Overall, Hamilton went 9–6 with a 2.69 ERA in 108 2/3 innings pitched. He was fifth in the Major League Baseball Rookie of the Year Award voting for the National League. In 1995, Hamilton went 6–9 with a 3.08 ERA in 30 starts and 204 1/3 innings pitched. Hamilton gave up 189 hits and 70 earned runs (89 unearned). Hamilton walked 56 batters and struck out 123. At age 25 in 1996, Hamilton put up a career high in wins (15) and his second most innings pitched (211 2/3). Hamilton accrued a 4.17 ERA in 33 starts, along with 206 hits allowed and 98 earned runs. In his fourth year with San Diego in 1997, Hamilton started on Opening Day for the Padres. In the game, he pitched six innings and gave up four runs on eight hits. The Padres won the game over the New York Mets 12–6. Hamilton compiled a 12–7 record with a 4.25 ERA for the season and gave up 69 walks and struck out 124. Hamilton suffered a shoulder injury that was described as an inflammation of the rotator cuff and bursa sac. This injury forced Hamilton onto the disabled list during the 1997 season. Hamilton called the injury "real scary", saying that he feared he may lose the ability to throw 100 miles per hour (160 km/h). During the 1998 off-season, San Diego acquired Kevin Brown through a trade with the Florida Marlins, giving San Diego three pitchers who could throw at 90 miles per hour (140 km/h) and above, including Hamilton. With the Padres in 1998, Hamilton's last season in San Diego, he had a 13–13 record, 4.27 ERA in 34 starts and 217 1/3 innings pitched. He walked a career-high 106 batters and struck out 147. There was a rumored trade around the 1998 MLB trade deadline that would have sent Hamilton to the Detroit Tigers, but it never materialized. During the 1998 World Series, the Padres scheduled Hamilton to pitch game four but was passed over for game one starter Kevin Brown and instead entered game three to relieve starter Sterling Hitchcock. With San Diego, Hamilton went 55 and 44 with a 3.75 ERA in 934 2/3 innings pitched.

=== After San Diego ===
After five years with San Diego, Hamilton was traded to the Toronto Blue Jays on December 12, 1998, for Peter Tucci, Carlos Almanzar, and Woody Williams. Analysts believe that Toronto acquired Hamilton if Roger Clemens's trade request was successful. Hamilton began the 1999 season with the Syracuse SkyChiefs, the Triple-A affiliate of the Blue Jays. He started three games, recording one loss, no wins, and a 5.11 ERA in 12 1/3 innings pitched. The Blue Jays called him up, and Hamilton made 18 starts in 22 games pitched. Pitching in 98 innings, he went 7–8 with a 6.52 ERA.

For the second time in his career, Hamilton began the season in Syracuse and went 3–2 with a 3.66 ERA in six games and 39 1/3 innings pitched. Hamilton had a shortened 2000 season for Toronto in which he went 2–1 with a 3.55 ERA in six games.

For the first time during his tenure with Toronto, Hamilton started the season with the Blue Jays. He went 5–8 with a 5.89 ERA in 22 games and 122 1/3 innings, before being released on August 3, 2001.

Hamilton signed with the Cincinnati Reds on August 17, 2001, and was optioned to their Triple-A team, the Louisville Bats. He made one start in Louisville, posting a 1–0 record with a 5.40 ERA. The Reds called him up, and he made four starts and went 1–2 with a 6.23 ERA.

Despite only recording one win for the team the year before, Hamilton was named the Reds' 2002 Opening Day starter. In the game, Hamilton allowed two runs on seven hits in five innings of work. The Reds won the game over the Chicago Cubs, 5–4. For the rest of the year, he spent time in Louisville and Cincinnati and posted a combined 5–10 record, 3.92 ERA, and started 20 games and pitched in relief in 22 games. According to ESPN's Peter Gammons, Hamilton, "looked like the '97 Hamilton" when he was making his comeback to the majors after spending time in the minors. At the conclusion of the 2002 season, he was offered arbitration by the Reds along with José Rijo, which they both rejected in mid-December, meaning the Reds could not sign them until May 1, 2003.

=== Final years ===
Hamilton was signed by the St. Louis Cardinals on January 6, 2003, but was released on March 26, 2003, after struggling in spring training. Hamilton then re-signed with the Cincinnati Reds on April 11, 2003. After posting a 12.66 ERA in three starts with the Reds, he was sent down to Louisville. He made 33 appearances for the Bats with an 8–3 record and a 3.23 ERA in 86 1/3 innings. On October 15, 2003, he became a free agent.

The Padres re-signed Hamilton on December 10, 2003, and optioned him to their Triple-A affiliate, the Portland Beavers. Hamilton appeared in 11 games with the Beavers, posting an 0–2 record and 5.36 ERA. Hamilton was released on June 7, 2004. He was signed by the New York Mets on March 10, 2005, to a minor league contract.
