= Scott Sanders (baseball) =

American baseball player (born 1969)

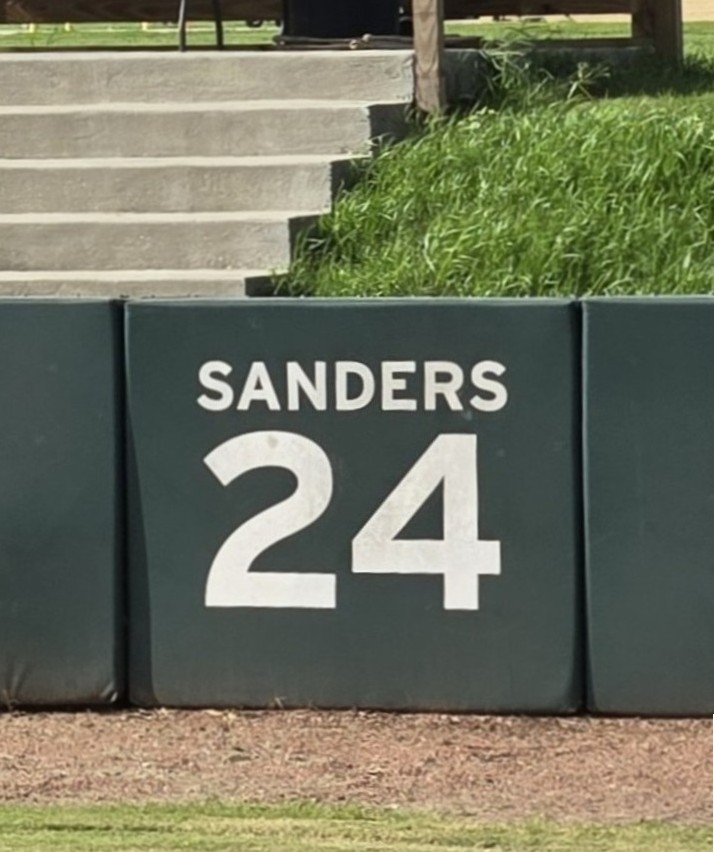
- Sanders' retired Nicholls Colonels uniform number
- Pitcher
- Born: March 25, 1969 (age 57); Hannibal, Missouri, U.S.
- Batted: Right Threw: Right

MLB debut
- August 6, 1993, for the San Diego Padres

Last MLB appearance
- October 3, 1999, for the Chicago Cubs

MLB statistics
- Win–loss record: 34–45
- Earned run average: 4.86
- Strikeouts: 632

NPB statistics
- Win–loss record: 3–5
- Earned run average: 4.36
- Strikeouts: 70
- Stats at Baseball Reference

Teams
- San Diego Padres (1993–1996); Seattle Mariners (1997); Detroit Tigers (1997–1998); San Diego Padres (1998); Chicago Cubs (1999); Nippon-Ham Fighters (2001)

Scott Gerald Sanders (born March 25, 1969) is an American former professional baseball right-handed pitcher. Sanders played college baseball at Nicholls State University. In his professional career from 1993–1999, Sanders played for the San Diego Padres (1993–1996, 1998), Seattle Mariners (1997), Detroit Tigers (1997–1998), and Chicago Cubs (1999), as well as the Nippon-Ham Fighters of Nippon Professional Baseball in 2001.

== Career ==
The Padres drafted Sanders with the 32nd overall see in the first round of the 1990 MLB draft. He debuted in the majors in 1993. San Diego traded Sanders to the Mariners in December 1996 for pitcher Sterling Hitchcock. In July 1997, Seattle traded him to Detroit. The following May, the Tigers sent him back to the Padres for a player to be named later. He pitched in his final MLB season with the Cubs in 1999. After his season in Japan, he pitched for the Albuquerque Isotopes in 2003 and 2004.

In his MLB career, Sanders compiled a 34–45 record and a 4.86 ERA. He appeared in 235 games, with 88 starts. In 681 2/3 innings pitched, he recorded 632 strikeouts. In his one season in NPB, Sanders had a 3–5 record and a 4.36 ERA. In 24 games, including 11 starts, he pitched 86 2/3 innings with 70 strikeouts.

== Personal life ==
Sanders' son, Cam, pitched in MLB for the Pittsburgh Pirates. Sanders has three other children. Sanders' father, Jerry, coached the Nicholls State men's basketball team.

In 1994, Sanders and teammate Derek Bell were arrested in New York City for allegedly attempting to solicit an undercover police officer posing as a prostitute.
