= 1998 Major League Baseball All-Star Game =

1998 American baseball competition

	1	2	3	4	5	6	7	8	9	R	H	E
American League	0	0	0	4	1	3	1	1	3	13	19	2
National League	0	0	2	1	3	0	0	2	0	8	12	1
- Date: July 7, 1998
- Venue: Coors Field
- City: Denver, Colorado
- Managers: Mike Hargrove (CLE); Jim Leyland (FLA)
- MVP: Roberto Alomar (BAL)
- Attendance: 51,267
- Ceremonial first pitch: Elias Kurts
- Television: NBC (United States); MLB International (International)
- TV announcers: Bob Costas and Joe Morgan (NBC); Gary Thorne and Ken Singleton (MLB International)
- Radio: ESPN
- Radio announcers: Charley Steiner and Kevin Kennedy

The 1998 Major League Baseball All-Star Game was the 69th playing of the midsummer classic between the all-stars of the American League (AL) and National League (NL), the two leagues comprising Major League Baseball. The game was held on July 7, 1998, at Coors Field in Denver, Colorado, the home of the Colorado Rockies of the National League. The first All-Star contest played in the Mountain Time Zone, the game resulted in the American League defeating the National League 13-8. It remains the highest-scoring All-Star Game in MLB history. Also, it was the last MLB All Star Game not to be held on the 2nd or 3rd Tuesday of July, it was held on the 1st Tuesday of July, and thus the earliest ASG held since then.

The pregame ceremony honored the United States Air Force Academy who provided the five-man color guard, flag presentations, and, at the end of country music singer Faith Hill's performance of the U.S. National Anthem, the flyover ceremonies. Hill's National Anthem performance was preceded by actress Gloria Reuben's performance of The Canadian National Anthem.

Twelve-year-old Elias Kurts was given the honor of throwing out the ceremonial first pitch, the first "non-celebrity" so honored.

== Rosters ==
Players in italics have since been inducted into the National Baseball Hall of Fame.

=== American League ===
Elected starters
Position	Player	Team	All-Star Games
C	Iván Rodríguez	Rangers	7
1B	Jim Thome	Indians	2
2B	Roberto Alomar	Orioles	9
3B	Cal Ripken Jr.	Orioles	16
SS	Alex Rodriguez	Mariners	3
OF	Juan González	Rangers	2
OF	Ken Griffey Jr.	Mariners	9
OF	Kenny Lofton	Indians	5

Pitchers
Position	Player	Team	All-Star Games
P	Rolando Arrojo	Devil Rays	1
P	Roger Clemens	Blue Jays	7
P	Bartolo Colón	Indians	1
P	Tom Gordon	Red Sox	1
P	Pedro Martínez	Red Sox	3
P	Troy Percival	Angels	2
P	Brad Radke	Twins	1
P	Aaron Sele	Rangers	1
P	David Wells	Yankees	2
P	John Wetteland	Rangers	2

Reserves
Position	Player	Team	All-Star Games
C	Sandy Alomar Jr.	Indians	6
1B	Rafael Palmeiro	Orioles	3
1B	Mo Vaughn (Note: Player declined or was unable to play.)	Red Sox	3
2B	Damion Easley	Tigers	1
2B	Ray Durham	White Sox	1
3B	Scott Brosius	Yankees	1
3B	Dean Palmer	Royals	1
SS	Derek Jeter	Yankees	1
SS	Omar Vizquel	Indians	1
OF	Darin Erstad	Angels	1
OF	Ben Grieve	Athletics	1
OF	Paul O'Neill	Yankees	5
OF	Manny Ramirez	Indians	2
OF	Bernie Williams	Yankees	2

=== National League ===
Elected starters
Position	Player	Team	All Star-Games
C	Mike Piazza	Mets	6
1B	Mark McGwire	Cardinals	10
2B	Craig Biggio	Astros	7
3B	Chipper Jones	Braves	3
SS	Walt Weiss	Braves	1
OF	Barry Bonds	Giants	8
OF	Tony Gwynn	Padres	14
OF	Larry Walker	Rockies	3

Pitchers
Position	Player	Team	All-Star Games
P	Andy Ashby	Padres	1
P	Kevin Brown	Padres	4
P	Tom Glavine	Braves	6
P	Trevor Hoffman	Padres	1
P	Greg Maddux	Braves	7
P	Robb Nen	Giants	1
P	Rick Reed	Mets	1
P	Curt Schilling	Phillies	2
P	Jeff Shaw	Dodgers (Note: Shaw was selected to the All-Star Game while a member of the Cincinnati Reds, then was traded to the Los Angeles Dodgers on July 4.)	1
P	Ugueth Urbina	Expos	1

Reserves
Position	Player	Team	All-Star Games
C	Jason Kendall	Pirates	2
C	Javy López	Braves	2
1B	Andrés Galarraga	Braves	4
2B	Bret Boone	Reds	1
2B	Fernando Viña	Brewers	1
3B	Vinny Castilla	Rockies	2
SS	Édgar Rentería	Marlins	1
OF	Moisés Alou	Astros	3
OF	Dante Bichette	Rockies	4
OF	Gary Sheffield	Dodgers	4
OF	Sammy Sosa	Cubs	2
OF	Greg Vaughn	Padres	3
OF	Devon White	Diamondbacks	3

== Game ==
=== Umpires ===
Home Plate	Ed Montague (NL)
First Base	Derryl Cousins (AL)
Second Base	Brian Gorman (NL)
Third Base	Rick Reed (AL)
Left Field	Rich Rieker (NL)
Right Field	Tim McClelland (AL)

=== Starting lineups ===
American League				National League			
Order	Player	Team	Position	Order	Player	Team	Position
1	Kenny Lofton	Indians	LF	1	Craig Biggio	Astros	2B
2	Roberto Alomar	Orioles	2B	2	Tony Gwynn	Padres	RF
3	Ken Griffey Jr.	Mariners	CF	3	Mark McGwire	Cardinals	1B
4	Juan González	Rangers	RF	4	Barry Bonds	Giants	LF
5	Jim Thome	Indians	1B	5	Chipper Jones	Braves	3B
6	Alex Rodriguez	Mariners	SS	6	Mike Piazza	Mets	C
7	Iván Rodríguez	Rangers	C	7	Larry Walker	Rockies	CF
8	Cal Ripken Jr.	Orioles	3B	8	Walt Weiss	Braves	SS
9	David Wells	Yankees	P	9	Greg Maddux	Braves	P

=== Game summary ===
Tuesday, July 7, 1998 6:29 pm (MT) at Coors Field in Denver, Colorado
Team	1	2	3	4	5	6	7	8	9	R	H	E
American League	0	0	0	4	1	3	1	1	3	13	19	2
National League	0	0	2	1	3	0	0	2	0	8	12	1
WP: Bartolo Colón (1-0) LP: Ugueth Urbina (0-1); Home runs: AL: Alex Rodriguez (1), Roberto Alomar (1); NL: Barry Bonds (1); Boxscore

== Home Run Derby ==
The Home Run Derby was won by Ken Griffey Jr., who did not decide to enter the competition until hearing boos from fans during batting practice.

Coors Field, Denver
Player	Team	Round 1	Round 2	Finals	Total (Note: Competition results were based on the individual totals during each round.)
Ken Griffey Jr.	Seattle	8	8	3	19
Jim Thome	Cleveland	7	8	2	17
Vinny Castilla	Colorado	7	5	–	12
Rafael Palmeiro	Baltimore	7	3	–	10
Moisés Alou	Houston	7 (Note: Alou did not advance to the second round based on having a lower number of regular season home runs.)	–	–	7
Javy López	Atlanta	5	–	–	5
Alex Rodriguez	Seattle	5	–	–	5
Mark McGwire	St. Louis	4	–	–	4
Damion Easley	Detroit	2	–	–	2
Chipper Jones	Atlanta	1	–	–	1
