= Ben Van Ryn =

American baseball player (born 1971)

- Pitcher
- Born: August 9, 1971 (age 53); Fort Wayne, Indiana, U.S.
- Batted: Left Threw: Left

MLB debut
- May 9, 1996, for the California Angels

Last MLB appearance
- September 26, 1998, for the Toronto Blue Jays

Career statistics
- Win–loss record: 0–2
- Earned run average: 5.74
- Strikeouts: 10
- Stats at Baseball Reference

Teams
- California Angels (1996); Chicago Cubs (1998); San Diego Padres (1998); Toronto Blue Jays (1998)

Benjamin Ashley Van Ryn (born August 9, 1971) is an American former Major League Baseball pitcher who played for two seasons. He played for the California Angels in 1996 and the Chicago Cubs, San Diego Padres, and Toronto Blue Jays in 1998.

Van Ryn graduated from East Noble High School in 1990 and was selected by the Montreal Expos in the first round of the 1990 MLB draft.
