= Mark Clark (baseball) =

American baseball player (born 1968)

- Pitcher
- Born: May 12, 1968 (age 58); Havana, Illinois, U.S.
- Batted: Right Threw: Right

MLB debut
- September 6, 1991, for the St. Louis Cardinals

Last MLB appearance
- July 1, 2000, for the Texas Rangers

MLB statistics
- Win–loss record: 74–71
- Earned run average: 4.61
- Strikeouts: 728
- Stats at Baseball Reference

Teams
- St. Louis Cardinals (1991–1992); Cleveland Indians (1993–1995); New York Mets (1996–1997); Chicago Cubs (1997–1998); Texas Rangers (1999–2000)

Mark Willard Clark (born May 12, 1968) is an American former right-handed pitcher in Major League Baseball. He pitched all or parts of ten seasons in the majors.

Clark was born in Bath, Illinois, and made his debut on September 6, 1991 for the St. Louis Cardinals. Over the next nine seasons, Clark would develop into a journeyman starting pitcher, being traded from team to team. He pitched in one postseason game in the 1998 National League Division Series for the Chicago Cubs, a game which he lost to John Smoltz and the Atlanta Braves.

He was released by the Texas Rangers during the 2000 season, then retired.
