= Don Wengert =

American baseball player (born 1969)

- Pitcher
- Born: November 6, 1969 (age 56); Sioux City, Iowa, U.S.
- Batted: Right Threw: Right

MLB debut
- April 30, 1995, for the Oakland Athletics

Last MLB appearance
- May 26, 2001, for the Pittsburgh Pirates

MLB statistics
- Win–loss record: 14–32
- Earned run average: 6.01
- Strikeouts: 226
- Stats at Baseball Reference

Teams
- Oakland Athletics (1995–1997); San Diego Padres (1998); Chicago Cubs (1998); Kansas City Royals (1999); Atlanta Braves (2000); Pittsburgh Pirates (2001)

Donald Paul Wengert (born November 6, 1969) is an American former professional baseball pitcher. He played all or part of seven seasons in Major League Baseball (MLB) from 1995 to 2001 for the Oakland Athletics, San Diego Padres, Chicago Cubs, Kansas City Royals, Atlanta Braves and Pittsburgh Pirates.

Wengert attended Iowa State University, and in 1991 played collegiate summer baseball with the Hyannis Mets of the Cape Cod Baseball League. He was selected by Oakland in the fourth round of the 1992 MLB draft.

Prior to attending Iowa State University, Wengert attended high school and played baseball at Bishop Heelan Catholic High School. His is the only number to be retired at his high school Alma Mater.
