= Kevin Brown (right-handed pitcher) =

American baseball player (born 1965)

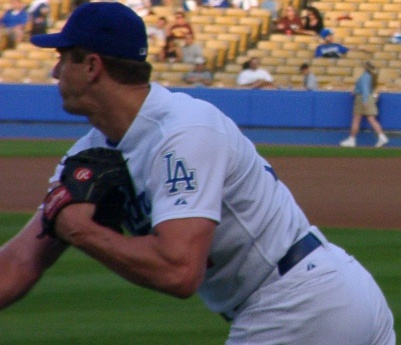
- Brown with the Los Angeles Dodgers in 2003
- Pitcher
- Born: March 14, 1965 (age 61); Milledgeville, Georgia, U.S.
- Batted: Right Threw: Right

MLB debut
- September 30, 1986, for the Texas Rangers

Last MLB appearance
- July 23, 2005, for the New York Yankees

MLB statistics
- Win–loss record: 211–144
- Earned run average: 3.28
- Strikeouts: 2,397
- Stats at Baseball Reference

Teams
- Texas Rangers (1986–1994); Baltimore Orioles (1995); Florida Marlins (1996–1997); San Diego Padres (1998); Los Angeles Dodgers (1999–2003); New York Yankees (2004–2005)

Career highlights and awards
- 6× All-Star (1992, 1996–1998, 2000, 2003); World Series champion (1997); MLB wins leader (1992); 2× NL ERA leader (1996, 2000); Pitched a no-hitter on June 10, 1997

James Kevin Brown (born March 14, 1965) is an American former professional baseball right-handed pitcher who played in Major League Baseball (MLB) from 1986 to 2005 for the Texas Rangers, Baltimore Orioles, Florida Marlins, San Diego Padres, Los Angeles Dodgers, and New York Yankees. Brown led the American League in wins once and led the National League in earned run average twice. He was a six-time MLB All-Star and threw a no-hitter in 1997.

== Amateur years ==
Brown attended Wilkinson County High School in Irwinton, Georgia, and was a student and a letterman in football, baseball, and tennis. Brown played three years of college baseball at Georgia Tech for their baseball team.

== Professional career ==
=== Texas Rangers ===
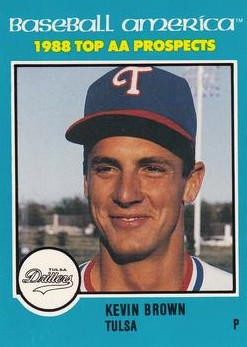
Brown with the Tulsa Drillers in 1988

The Texas Rangers selected Brown in the first round, with the fourth pick overall, in the 1986 Major League Baseball draft. Starting in 1989, Brown was second in the Rangers' rotation behind ace Nolan Ryan and posted a 12–9 record with a 3.35 ERA and 104 strikeouts in 1989 and a 12–10 record with a 3.60 ERA and 88 strikeouts in 1990. By 1992, Brown had improved his record with the Rangers to a 21–11 with 173 strikeouts and a 3.32 ERA, was tied for the league lead in victories and was the first since Ferguson Jenkins in 1974 to win 20 games in a Ranger uniform.

=== Baltimore Orioles ===
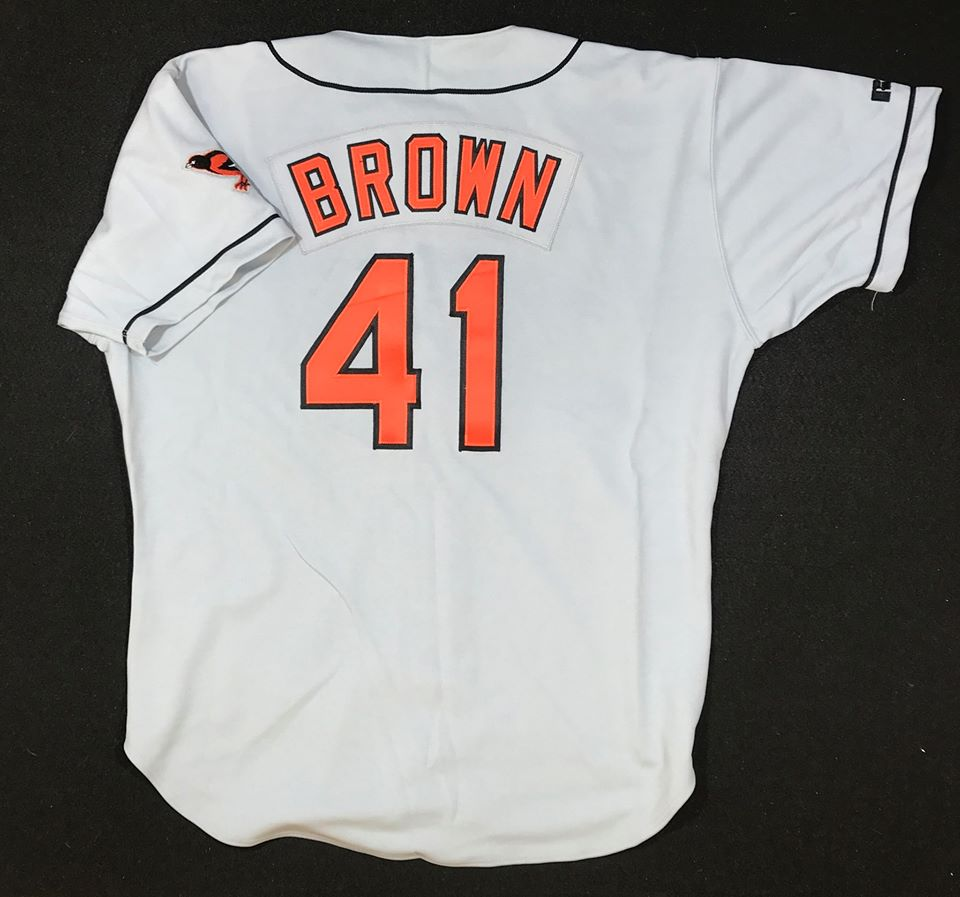
1995 Baltimore Orioles #41 Kevin Brown road jersey

Brown became a free agent following the strike settlement in 1994 and signed with the Baltimore Orioles for a season, posting a 10–9 record with 117 strikeouts and a 3.60 ERA.

=== Florida Marlins ===
Following the 1995 season, Brown again became a free agent, signing with the Florida Marlins for $12.9 million over three years. In his first season with the Marlins, Brown posted a 17–11 record with 159 strikeouts and an MLB best 1.89 ERA, finishing second in the Cy Young Award voting.

In 1997, Brown threw a one-hitter against the Los Angeles Dodgers in his first appearance and a no-hitter against the San Francisco Giants on June 10, 1997. The only base runner in the game for the Giants came via a HBP with two outs and two strikes in the eighth inning.

In the 1997 National League Championship Series, Brown, while sick with the flu, pitched a complete game in Game Six to defeat the Atlanta Braves and reach the World Series. Brown was the losing pitcher in both his starts against the Cleveland Indians.

=== San Diego Padres ===
Following the disassembly of the Marlins' championship team, Brown was traded to the San Diego Padres for Derrek Lee and prospects, where he pitched one season. He posted an 18–7 record with a career-high 257 strikeouts and a 2.38 ERA, finishing third in the Cy Young Award voting.

Masterful during the National League Division Series against the Houston Astros, San Diego won both of Brown's starts by a 2–1 score. As the Game 1 starter opposing Randy Johnson, he allowed no runs in eight innings and struck out 16 Astros, a career-high, and second to that point in MLB playoff history only to Bob Gibson's 17-strikeout performance in the 1968 World Series.

He helped lead the Padres to the World Series with a three-hit shutout against the Braves in the NLCS, though he did blow a save in Game 5 during a rare relief appearance. Brown was ultimately the losing pitcher in Game Four as the New York Yankees swept the Padres in the 1998 World Series.

=== Los Angeles Dodgers ===
Following the 1998 season, Brown again became a free agent. He signed a lucrative contract with the Los Angeles Dodgers for 7 years/$105 million USD, becoming the first $100 million man in baseball. Enrique Rojas of ESPN Deportes called the contract "one of the worst deals ever from a team's point of view" because Brown averaged only nine wins per season and was frequently injured during the seven years of the deal.

In Brown's first season in Los Angeles, he posted an 18–9 record with 221 strikeouts and a 3.00 ERA. After leading the NL in ERA during an injury-plagued 2000 season, his performance began to dwindle as Brown was hampered by injuries and poor run support. In 2003, Brown rebounded, producing a respectable 14–9 record with 185 strikeouts and a 2.39 ERA.

=== New York Yankees ===
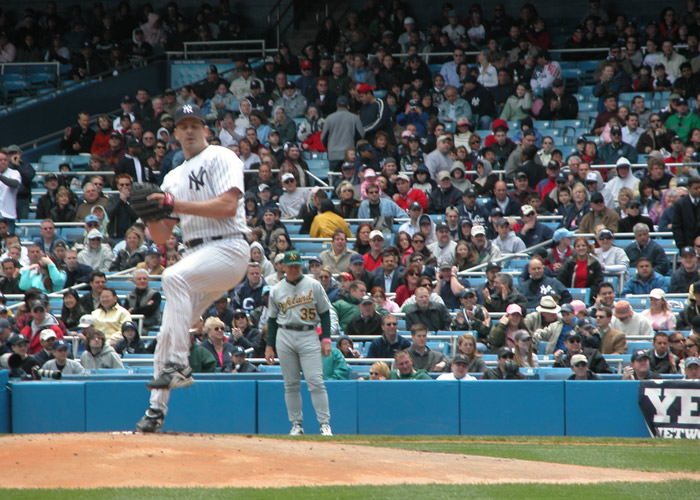
Brown pitching with the New York Yankees in 2005

On December 11, 2003, Brown was traded to the New York Yankees as part of a deal that sent Jeff Weaver, Yhency Brazobán, Brandon Weeden, and $2.6 million in cash to Los Angeles. In 2004, he posted a 10–6 record with a 4.09 ERA, but experienced health problems throughout the season. Toward the end of the season, he punched a concrete column in frustration, breaking his hand. He returned to the rotation near the end of September but failed to get out of the first inning in a start at Fenway Park.

During that season's playoffs, Brown pitched well in the Division Series, but then lasted only two innings in his first start of the 2004 American League Championship Series (ALCS) against the Red Sox.

However, it was Brown's performance in Game 7 of the ALCS (with the Yankees trying to avoid being the first team in baseball history to lose a series they led three games to none) that he is perhaps most negatively remembered for in New York: Brown lasted less than two innings while being charged with five earned runs, including a two-run homer to David Ortiz in the first inning. He left with the bases loaded in the second inning (allowing Johnny Damon to subsequently hit the first pitch from Javier Vazquez for a grand slam).

Brown attempted to come back in 2005 but missed several games during the season due to injury. He went 4–7 with a 6.50 ERA. On February 20, 2006, Brown announced his retirement.

== Mitchell Report ==
The Mitchell Report named Brown as one of a group of Los Angeles Dodgers implicated in steroid use. The report documents allegations by Kirk Radomski that he sold Brown human growth hormone and Deca-Durabolin over a period of two or three years beginning in either 2000 or 2001. Radomski claims he was introduced to Brown by Paul Lo Duca. Radomski's claims were supported by an Express Mail receipt dated June 7, 2004, addressed to Brown. The report also contains notes from a meeting of Dodgers executives in 2003 during which they question the medication Brown takes and include a note stating "Steroids speculated by GM". Brown declined to meet with the Mitchell investigators.

Bill Plaschke states that by 2003 "it was obvious to me...(and) Dodger management that...(he was) probably on steroids. We would even talk about it while watching their bulging, straining bodies from the dugout during batting practice. But the players would admit nothing, so there was nothing I could write." Brown's temper tantrums, Plaschke notes, may have in fact been "roid rage."

== Pitching assessment ==
Brown was a pitcher who had the rare talent of relying both on movement and velocity. His main pitch was a sinking fastball that averaged 91–96 mph, with tremendous tailing, downward movement. He could spot it to either side of the plate. Batters facing him generally pounded this pitch into the ground or missed it entirely. He complemented this pitch with a sharp slider in the high 80s and a solid split fingered fastball he used against left-handed hitters or for another look.

Over his career, Brown won 211 games and finished his career with a 127 ERA+ (27% better than the league-wide earned run average). Only seven pitchers have won between 200 and 220 games with an ERA+ between 120 and 135. Of those seven, Stan Coveleski (215 wins, 128 ERA+), John Smoltz (213/125), Don Drysdale (209/121), and Hal Newhouser (207/130) are in the Baseball Hall of Fame. Only Curt Schilling, Eddie Cicotte (209/123) of Black Sox infamy and Brown have been excluded.

== Personal life ==
Brown resides in Macon, Georgia, with his wife, Candace, and four sons: Ridge, Grayson, Dawson, and Maclain. He is currently an assistant baseball coach at Tattnall Square Academy.

Since retiring, Brown has been involved in multiple handgun-related incidents. In August 2006, his neighbor reported that Brown pulled out a gun during a dispute over yard debris. No charges were filed. In June 2018, Brown held two suspected mail thieves at gunpoint until police arrived.

== See also ==
- List of Major League Baseball annual shutout leaders
- List of Major League Baseball career games started leaders
- List of Major League Baseball career hit batsmen leaders
- List of Major League Baseball career putouts as a pitcher leaders
- List of Major League Baseball career strikeout leaders
- List of Major League Baseball career wild pitches leaders
- List of Major League Baseball career wins leaders
- List of Major League Baseball no-hitters
- List of Major League Baseball players named in the Mitchell Report
- List of Miami Marlins no-hitters
- List of Miami Marlins team records
- List of World Series starting pitchers

Awards and achievements
Preceded by Jack Morris	American League All-Star Game Starting Pitcher; 1992	Succeeded by Mark Langston
Preceded by Hideo Nomo	No-hitter pitcher June 10, 1997	Succeeded by Francisco Córdova & Ricardo Rincón
Preceded by Ramón Martínez; Chan-Ho Park	Los Angeles Dodgers Opening Day; Starting pitcher 1999–2000; 2002	Succeeded by Chan-Ho Park; Hideo Nomo
