= Sterling Hitchcock =

American baseball player (born 1971)

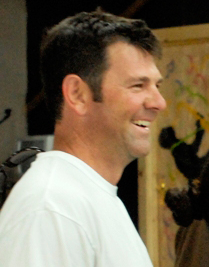
- Pitcher
- Born: April 29, 1971 (age 55); Fayetteville, North Carolina, U.S.
- Batted: Left Threw: Left

MLB debut
- September 11, 1992, for the New York Yankees

Last MLB appearance
- August 22, 2004, for the San Diego Padres

MLB statistics
- Win–loss record: 74–76
- Earned run average: 4.80
- Strikeouts: 997
- Stats at Baseball Reference

Teams
- New York Yankees (1992–1995); Seattle Mariners (1996); San Diego Padres (1997–2001); New York Yankees (2001–2003); St. Louis Cardinals (2003); San Diego Padres (2004)

Career highlights and awards
- NLCS MVP (1998)

Sterling Alex Hitchcock (born April 29, 1971) is an American former Major League Baseball left-handed pitcher. He played from 1992 to 2004, mostly with the New York Yankees and San Diego Padres.

== Early life ==
Hitchcock was born in Fayetteville, North Carolina. He attended Armwood High School in Seffner, Florida.

== Professional career ==
The Yankees selected Hitchcock in the ninth round of the 1989 Major League Baseball draft. Though he committed to attend the University of South Florida, the Yankees signed Hitchcock with a $50,000 signing bonus. He made his Major League debut in 1992, pitching his first full season in 1994. He was traded to the Mariners after the 1995 season with Russ Davis for Tino Martinez, Jeff Nelson, and Jim Mecir.

The following winter, the Mariners sent him to San Diego for Scott Sanders. Hitchcock is best remembered for his performance in the 1998 playoffs with the Padres, in which he was named the NLCS MVP. He was the winning pitcher in both of his starts with a 0.90 ERA in the NLCS. Overall in the 1998 playoffs he was 3–0, allowing 3 runs in 22 innings (1.23 ERA) with 32 strikeouts.

His successful years with the Padres were followed by struggles with injuries. He underwent Tommy John surgery. The Padres traded Hitchcock back to the Yankees in mid-2001 for two minor leaguers. Hitchcock was the winning pitcher for the Yankees in Game 5 of the 2001 World Series. He re-signed with the Yankees after the season. The Yankees traded Hitchcock to the St. Louis Cardinals in 2003 for Justin Pope and Ben Julianel. He finished his career with the Padres in 2004.

During the regular season, Hitchcock's career-best win–loss record was 13–9 with Seattle in 1996. His career-best ERA was 3.93 with the Padres in 1998.
