= Donne Wall =

American baseball player (born 1967)

- Pitcher
- Born: July 11, 1967 (age 58); Potosi, Missouri, U.S.
- Batted: Right Threw: Right

MLB debut
- September 2, 1995, for the Houston Astros

Last MLB appearance
- June 11, 2002, for the Anaheim Angels

MLB statistics
- Win–loss record: 31–28
- Earned run average: 4.20
- Strikeouts: 322
- Stats at Baseball Reference

Teams
- Houston Astros (1995–1997); San Diego Padres (1998–2000); New York Mets (2001); Anaheim Angels (2002)

Donnell Lee Wall (born July 11, 1967) is an American former professional baseball player who pitched in Major League Baseball for the Houston Astros, San Diego Padres, New York Mets, and Anaheim Angels, primarily in relief from 1995 to 2002.

Wall was born in Potosi, Missouri.

In 234 games in the majors, Wall compiled a 31–28 record, with 322 strikeouts and a 4.20 ERA. Wall was the losing pitcher for the Padres in Game 1 of the 1998 World Series.
