= Andy Ashby =

American baseball player (born 1967)

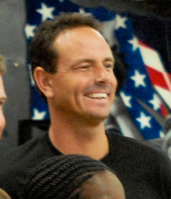
- Pitcher
- Born: July 11, 1967 (age 59); Kansas City, Missouri, U.S.
- Batted: Right Threw: Right

MLB debut
- June 10, 1991, for the Philadelphia Phillies

Last MLB appearance
- September 14, 2004, for the San Diego Padres

MLB statistics
- Win–loss record: 98–110
- Earned run average: 4.12
- Strikeouts: 1,173
- Stats at Baseball Reference

Teams
- Philadelphia Phillies (1991–1992); Colorado Rockies (1993); San Diego Padres (1993–1999); Philadelphia Phillies (2000); Atlanta Braves (2000); Los Angeles Dodgers (2001–2003); San Diego Padres (2004)

Career highlights and awards
- 2× All-Star (1998, 1999)

Andrew Jason Ashby (born July 11, 1967) is an American former professional baseball starting pitcher. He played in Major League Baseball (MLB) for the Philadelphia Phillies, Colorado Rockies, San Diego Padres, Atlanta Braves, and Los Angeles Dodgers. Listed at 6' 1", 180 lb., Ashby batted and threw right-handed. He was born in Kansas City, Missouri, and is the uncle to Milwaukee Brewers pitcher Aaron Ashby.

== Career ==
Ashby attended Park Hill High School in Kansas City and played baseball with the Crowder Roughriders at Crowder College. He was signed as an undrafted free agent in 1986 by the Phillies, with whom he made his Major League debut in 1991.

On June 15, 1991, Ashby threw an immaculate inning, striking out all three batters on nine total pitches, in the fourth inning of a 3–1 loss to the Cincinnati Reds; he became the 15th National League pitcher and the 24th pitcher in major-league history to accomplish the feat.

Ashby was acquired by the Colorado Rockies in the 1993 expansion draft, but after compiling an 0–4 record with an 8.50 ERA, he was dealt to the San Diego Padres at the end of the season. One highlight of Ashby's tenure with the Rockies occurred when he notched his one and only career save on May 25, 1993, against the Astros. Ashby went one inning to preserve a 7-5 Rockies victory.

Despite injuries to his shoulder, elbow and back, Ashby saw the greatest success of his career with the Padres. His most productive season came in 1998, when he helped the Padres reach the World Series with a 17–9 record and a 3.34 ERA. He was also a member of the 1998 and 1999 National League All-Star team. In eight seasons with the Padres, Ashby compiled a 70–62 record with a 3.59 ERA.

Ashby returned to the Phillies when he was traded from the Padres for Adam Eaton, Carlton Loewer and Steve Montgomery on November 10, 1999. The transaction was a cost-cutting measure by the Padres. Ashby had been touted as a potential ace for the struggling Phillies pitching staff. However, he pitched poorly, going 4–7 with a 5.68 ERA. He was sent to the Atlanta Braves midseason, where he helped the team reach the playoffs with an 8–6 record and a 4.13 ERA.

Ashby spent the next three years with the Los Angeles Dodgers, going 14–23 while posting a 4.31 ERA. At the end of 2003, he underwent Tommy John surgery. He made a brief two game return stint as a reliever with San Diego in 2004 and was signed by the team before the 2006 season, but retired.

In a 14-season career, Ashby posted a 98–110 record with 1173 strikeouts and a 4.12 ERA in 1810 innings pitched.

Since 2013, Ashby has done work as a TV Analyst for Bally Sports San Diego on Padres games. He and his family have homes in San Diego and Pennsylvania.

== Personal life ==
Ashby has four daughters.

Ashby's nephew, Aaron, is a pitcher with the Milwaukee Brewers.
