= Greg Vaughn =

American baseball player (born 1965)

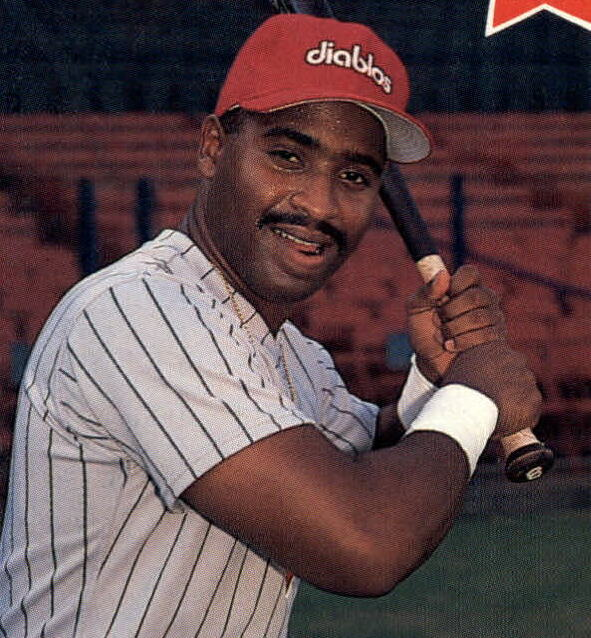
- Vaughn with the El Paso Diablos c. 1988
- Left fielder / Designated hitter
- Born: July 3, 1965 (age 61); Sacramento, California, U.S.
- Batted: Right Threw: Right

MLB debut
- August 10, 1989, for the Milwaukee Brewers

Last MLB appearance
- July 10, 2003, for the Colorado Rockies

MLB statistics
- Batting average: .242
- Home runs: 355
- Runs batted in: 1,072
- Stats at Baseball Reference

Teams
- Milwaukee Brewers (1989–1996); San Diego Padres (1996–1998); Cincinnati Reds (1999); Tampa Bay Devil Rays (2000–2002); Colorado Rockies (2003)

Career highlights and awards
- 4× All-Star (1993, 1996, 1998, 2001); Silver Slugger Award (1998); Milwaukee Brewers Wall of Honor

Gregory Lamont Vaughn (born July 3, 1965) is an American former professional baseball left fielder who played for the Milwaukee Brewers (1989–1996), San Diego Padres (1996–1998), Cincinnati Reds (1999), Tampa Bay Devil Rays (2000–2002) and Colorado Rockies (2003) of Major League Baseball (MLB). He was born in Sacramento, California, where he attended Kennedy High School. He then played baseball at the University of Miami. He is the cousin of fellow former major leaguers Mo Vaughn and Jerry Royster.

== Career ==
=== Amateur ===
In 1984 and 1985, Vaughn played collegiate summer baseball for the Cotuit Kettleers of the Cape Cod Baseball League (CCBL). He led the Kettleers to league titles in both seasons, and was league MVP in 1985. Vaughn was inducted into the CCBL Hall of Fame in 2009.

=== Professional ===
Vaughn was selected by the Brewers in the fourth round (75th pick) of the 1984 amateur draft. A slugger whose batting average dropped below .250 as often as rising above it, he compensated with excellent power. He had three seasons with at least 100 runs batted in, and four with 30 or more home runs — including the 1998 season, when he hit 50 to finish fourth in the major leagues behind Ken Griffey Jr., Sammy Sosa, and Mark McGwire, who set the home run record that season. In 1999, he became the first player in major league history to be traded after a 50-homer season when the Padres traded him to the Cincinnati Reds. Vaughn's arrival in Cincinnati caused a bit of a controversy with club ownership, as he refused to shave his goatee to comply with the Reds' policy of no facial hair. Fans urged owner Marge Schott to lift the long-standing policy that had been in place since 1967, which she eventually did. On the field, Vaughn hit 45 homers and became the second player in major league history to hit 40 or more homers in consecutive seasons with two different teams (one year after Andrés Galarraga became the first).

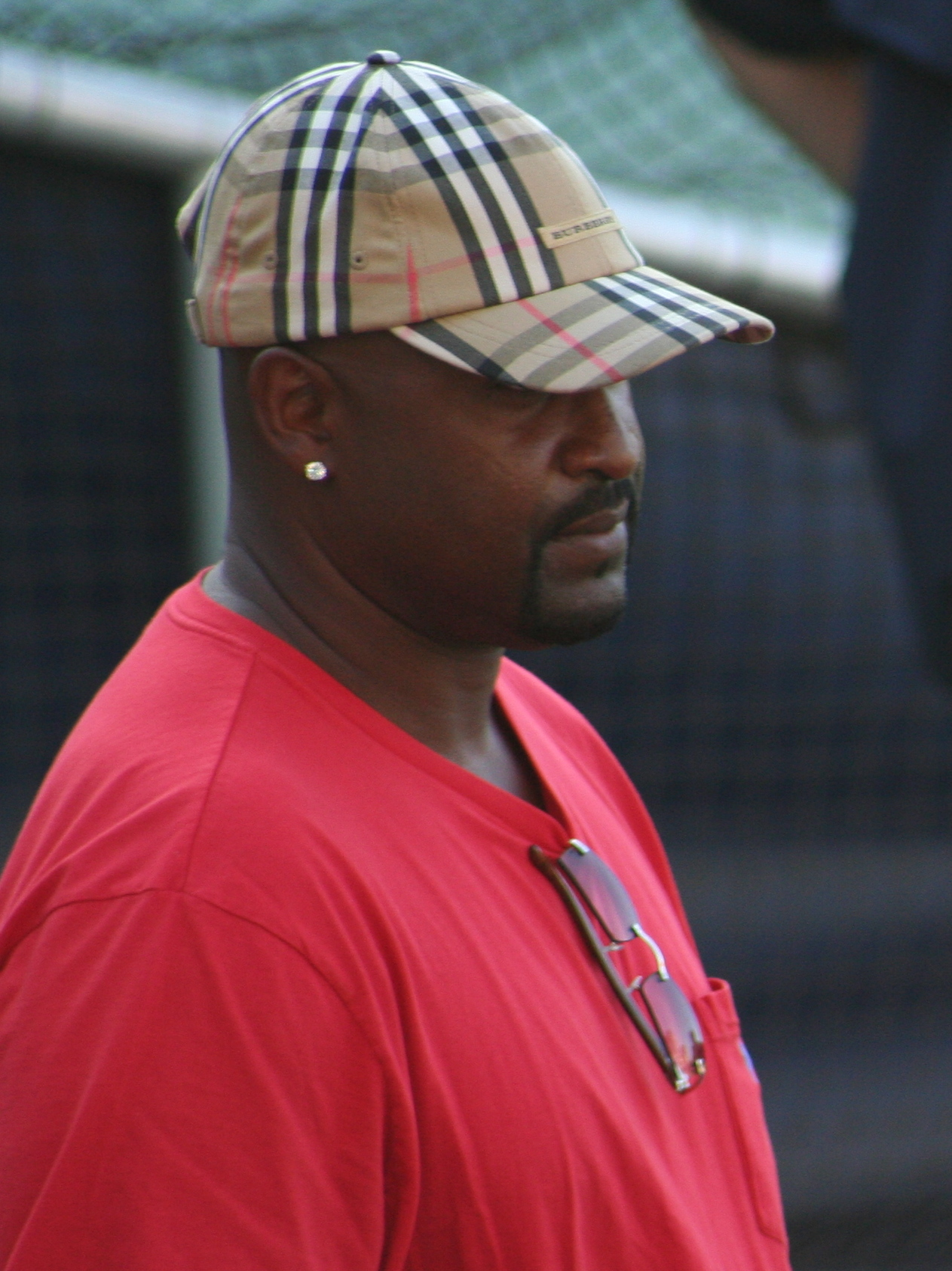
Vaughn in 2006

Earning back-to-back 4th place finishes in NL MVP voting, 1998-99 would be Vaughn's career peak. During his career, Vaughn batted .242 with 355 home runs, 1,072 RBI, 1,017 runs, 1475 hits, 284 doubles, 23 triples and 121 stolen bases in 1731 games.

Vaughn became eligible for the National Baseball Hall of Fame in 2009. 75% of the vote was necessary for induction, and 5% was necessary to stay on the ballot. He received no votes and dropped off the ballot.

== Personal life ==
His son, Cory Vaughn, played minor league baseball in the New York Mets organization.

== See also ==
- 50 home run club
- List of Major League Baseball career home run leaders
- List of Major League Baseball career runs scored leaders
- List of Major League Baseball career runs batted in leaders

Preceded by Vladimir Guerrero	National League Player of the Month; September 1999	Succeeded by Vladimir Guerrero
