= Dan Miceli =

American baseball player (born 1970)

- Pitcher
- Born: September 9, 1970 (age 56); Newark, New Jersey, U.S.
- Batted: Right Threw: Right

Professional debut
- MLB: September 9, 1993, for the Pittsburgh Pirates
- NPB: April 1, 2005, for the Yomiuri Giants

Last appearance
- NPB: April 10, 2005, for the Yomiuri Giants
- MLB: September 29, 2006, for the Tampa Bay Devil Rays

MLB statistics
- Win–loss record: 43–52
- Earned run average: 4.48
- Strikeouts: 632

NPB statistics
- Win–loss record: 0–2
- Earned run average: 23.63
- Strikeouts: 3
- Stats at Baseball Reference

Teams
- Pittsburgh Pirates (1993–1996); Detroit Tigers (1997); San Diego Padres (1998–1999); Florida Marlins (2000–2001); Colorado Rockies (2001); Texas Rangers (2002); Colorado Rockies (2003); Cleveland Indians (2003); New York Yankees (2003); Houston Astros (2003–2004); Yomiuri Giants (2005); Colorado Rockies (2005); Tampa Bay Devil Rays (2006)

Daniel Miceli (born September 9, 1970) is an American former Major League Baseball (MLB) relief pitcher.

== Early career ==
Miceli began playing baseball during his senior year at Dr. Phillips High School in Florida where he was teammates with Brian Barber and won a single game as a pitcher. Miceli received an offer to play college baseball at Polk Community College and was not selected in the Major League Baseball draft. He signed with the Kansas City Royals after seeing an advertisement for an open tryout in the Orlando Sentinel.

Miceli never saw time at the major league level for Kansas City. Instead, he was dealt to the Pittsburgh Pirates (July 31, 1993) with pitcher Jon Lieber in exchange for pitcher Stan Belinda. Miceli made his major league debut on his birthday, September 9, 1993.

The Pirates tried Miceli as both a starter and in the bullpen, but the right-hander found his niche as a reliever, collecting a career high 21 saves in 1995. Miceli had a high ERA in Pittsburgh, a tendency that has followed him throughout his career. The Pirates then traded Miceli to the Detroit Tigers (November 1, 1996) for pitcher Clint Sodowsky.

Miceli in Detroit recorded over 82 innings all in relief. The oft-traded reliever was moved once again to the San Diego Padres with fellow pitcher Donne Wall and minor leaguer Ryan Balfe, for outfielder Trey Beamon and reliever Tim Worrell.

Miceli was an important piece of the Padres' 1998 National League Champion team. An ineffective 1999 campaign saw Miceli on the move again, this time to the Florida Marlins.

== Later years ==
From 2000 through 2005, Miceli's services were sought by contenders and non-contenders alike, as teams attempted to fill vacancies in their bullpen. Miceli made stops in Florida, Texas, Cleveland, New York, Colorado (three times), Houston and even an overseas stay in Japan as member of the Yomiuri Giants.

On July 29, 2003, Miceli became part of the Astros relief corps. In 2004, Miceli went 6–6 with a respectable 3.59 ERA, and made career highs in games (74) and strikeouts (83). Miceli also made his second postseason trip that season, coming within a game of another World Series berth. While he was a significant bullpen contributor during the regular season, he pitched poorly in the postseason. He became part of history when he gave up walkoff home runs in Game 2 of the NLDS and Game 6 of the NLCS to become the first pitcher in major league history to have given up multiple walkoff postseason home runs in the same postseason and also the first pitcher to have given up multiple postseason walk-off home runs for a career; no other pitcher has matched Miceli in either category as of 2026. In five total games of the postseason run, he had an ERA of 11.57.

In contrast to his solid 2004 season, his performance in Japan was one of the worst in his career, losing 2 consecutive games to the Hiroshima Toyo Carp and Yokohama BayStars, which were his first two games. This resulted in him becoming the player released after the shortest amount of time (4 games) in Giants' history.

On January 12, 2006, the journeyman signed on with his tenth team, the Tampa Bay Devil Rays, agreeing to a two-year deal. Part of a closer by committee system in Tampa, Miceli earned four saves and held opponents to a .217 batting average. A majority of Miceli's season was lost due to a right shoulder injury. The veteran righty entered as a candidate for the Rays' closer in 2007. Poor results during spring training cost the well traveled reliever a spot on Tampa Bay's forty-man roster, and on March 29, Miceli was released from the team.

In 631 career games, Miceli had a 43–52 record, with 4.48 ERA. He collected 632 strikeouts, and 310 walks in just over 700 innings pitched. Miceli also had 39 career saves, and had two singles in 22 at-bats.

On January 22, 2008, Miceli signed with the Boston Red Sox on a minor league contract with invitation to spring training. He announced his retirement on March 1, 2008.

=== Long Island Ducks ===
Despite announcing his retirement, Miceli joined the Long Island Ducks for the 2009 season.
