= 1998 Colorado Rockies season =

1998 Colorado Rockies
- League: National League
- Division: West
- Ballpark: Coors Field
- City: Denver, Colorado
- Record: 77–85 (.475)
- Divisional place: 4th
- Owner: Jerry McMorris
- General manager: Bob Gebhard
- Manager: Don Baylor
- Television: KWGN-TV; Fox Sports Rocky Mountain (George Frazier, Dave Armstrong)
- Radio: KOA (AM) (Wayne Hagin, Jeff Kingery); KCUV (Antonio Guevara)
- Stats: ESPN.com; Baseball Reference

The Colorado Rockies' 1998 season was the sixth for the Rockies. They tried to win the National League West. Don Baylor was their manager, although he was fired after the season. They played home games and hosted the 1998 Major League Baseball All-Star Game at Coors Field. They finished with a record of 77-85, fourth in the division.

== Offseason ==
- November 18, 1997: Harvey Pulliam was traded by the Colorado Rockies to the Arizona Diamondbacks for Chuck McElroy.
- November 18, 1997: Mike Lansing was traded by the Montreal Expos to the Colorado Rockies for Jake Westbrook, John Nicholson (minors), and Mark Hamlin (minors).
- November 18, 1997: Quinton McCracken and Bryan Rekar were drafted by the Tampa Bay Devil Rays from the Colorado Rockies as the 4th and 38th picks in the 1997 expansion draft.
- December 4, 1997: Darryl Kile was signed as a free agent by the Colorado Rockies.
- December 10, 1997: Mark Hutton was traded by the Colorado Rockies to the Cincinnati Reds for Curtis Goodwin.
- December 10, 1997: Dave Veres was traded by the Montreal Expos with Mark Hamlin (minors) to the Colorado Rockies for Terry Jones and a player to be named later. The Colorado Rockies sent Mark Mangum (minors) (June 5, 1998) to the Montreal Expos to complete the trade.

== Regular season ==
=== Opening Day starters ===
| 3 | Mike Lansing | 2B |
| 26 | Ellis Burks | CF |
| 33 | Larry Walker | RF |
| 10 | Dante Bichette | LF |
| 14 | Vinny Castilla | 3B |
| 17 | Todd Helton | 1B |
| 5 | Neifi Perez | SS |
| 8 | Kirt Manwaring | C |
| 57 | Darryl Kile | P |

=== Season standings ===
NL West
| Team | W | L | Pct. | GB | Home | Road |
|---|---|---|---|---|---|---|
| San Diego Padres | 98 | 64 | .605 | — | 54‍–‍27 | 44‍–‍37 |
| San Francisco Giants | 89 | 74 | .546 | 9½ | 49‍–‍32 | 40‍–‍42 |
| Los Angeles Dodgers | 83 | 79 | .512 | 15 | 48‍–‍33 | 35‍–‍46 |
| Colorado Rockies | 77 | 85 | .475 | 21 | 42‍–‍39 | 35‍–‍46 |
| Arizona Diamondbacks | 65 | 97 | .401 | 33 | 34‍–‍47 | 31‍–‍50 |

=== Record vs. opponents ===
1998 National League record Source: MLB Standings Grid – 1998
| Team | AZ | ATL | CHC | CIN | COL | FLA | HOU | LAD | MIL | MON | NYM | PHI | PIT | SD | SF | STL | AL |
|---|---|---|---|---|---|---|---|---|---|---|---|---|---|---|---|---|---|
| Arizona | — | 1–8 | 5–7 | 4–5 | 6–6 | 6–2 | 4–5 | 4–8 | 6–3 | 2–7 | 4–5 | 2–7 | 6–3 | 3–9 | 5–7 | 2–7 | 5–8 |
| Atlanta | 8–1 | — | 3–6 | 7–2 | 5–3 | 7–5 | 4–5 | 8–1 | 7–2 | 6–6 | 9–3 | 8–4 | 7–2 | 5–4 | 7–2 | 6–3 | 9–7 |
| Chicago | 7–5 | 6–3 | — | 6–5 | 7–2 | 7–2 | 4–7 | 4–5 | 6–6 | 7–2 | 4–5 | 3–6 | 8–3 | 5–4 | 7–3 | 4–7 | 5–8 |
| Cincinnati | 5–4 | 2–7 | 5–6 | — | 4–5 | 9–0 | 3–8 | 5–4 | 6–5 | 8–1 | 3–6 | 4–5 | 5–7 | 1–11 | 2–7 | 8–3 | 7-6 |
| Colorado | 6–6 | 3–5 | 2–7 | 5–4 | — | 6–3 | 6–5 | 6–6 | 4–7 | 7–2 | 3–6 | 5–4 | 5–4 | 5–7 | 7–5 | 3–6 | 4–8 |
| Florida | 2–6 | 5–7 | 2–7 | 0–9 | 3–6 | — | 3–6 | 4–5 | 0–9 | 5–7 | 5–7 | 6–6 | 3–6 | 4–5 | 0–9 | 4–5 | 8–8 |
| Houston | 5–4 | 5–4 | 7–4 | 8–3 | 5–6 | 6–3 | — | 3–6 | 9–2 | 7–2 | 5–4 | 7–2 | 9–2 | 5–4 | 6–3 | 5–7 | 10–4 |
| Los Angeles | 8–4 | 1–8 | 5–4 | 4–5 | 6–6 | 5–4 | 6–3 | — | 5–4 | 5–4 | 3–5 | 5–4 | 7–5 | 5–7 | 6–6 | 4–5 | 8–5 |
| Milwaukee | 3–6 | 2–7 | 6–6 | 5–6 | 7–4 | 9–0 | 2–9 | 4–5 | — | 6–3 | 1–8 | 4–5 | 6–5 | 3–6 | 5–4 | 3–8 | 8–6 |
| Montreal | 7–2 | 6–6 | 2–7 | 1–8 | 2–7 | 7–5 | 2–7 | 4–5 | 3–6 | — | 8–4 | 5–7 | 2–7 | 4–4 | 3–6 | 3–6 | 6–10 |
| New York | 5–4 | 3–9 | 5–4 | 6–3 | 6–3 | 7–5 | 4–5 | 5–3 | 8–1 | 4–8 | — | 8–4 | 4–5 | 4–5 | 4–5 | 6–3 | 9–7 |
| Philadelphia | 7–2 | 4–8 | 6–3 | 5–4 | 4–5 | 6–6 | 2–7 | 4–5 | 5–4 | 7–5 | 4–8 | — | 8–1 | 1–8 | 2–6 | 3–6 | 7–9 |
| Pittsburgh | 3–6 | 2–7 | 3–8 | 7–5 | 4–5 | 6–3 | 2–9 | 5–7 | 5–6 | 7–2 | 5–4 | 1–8 | — | 5–4 | 2–7 | 6–5 | 6–7 |
| San Diego | 9–3 | 4–5 | 4–5 | 11–1 | 7–5 | 5–4 | 4–5 | 7–5 | 6–3 | 4–4 | 5–4 | 8–1 | 4–5 | — | 8–4 | 6–3 | 6–7 |
| San Francisco | 7–5 | 2–7 | 3–7 | 7–2 | 5–7 | 9–0 | 3–6 | 6–6 | 4–5 | 6–3 | 5–4 | 6–2 | 7–2 | 4–8 | — | 7–5 | 8–5 |
| St. Louis | 7–2 | 3–6 | 7–4 | 3–8 | 6–3 | 5-4 | 7–5 | 5–4 | 8–3 | 6–3 | 3–6 | 6–3 | 5–6 | 3–6 | 5–7 | — | 4–9 |

=== Notable transactions ===
- June 2, 1998: Matt Holliday was drafted by the Colorado Rockies in the 7th round of the 1998 amateur draft. Player signed July 24, 1998.
- June 2, 1998: Juan Pierre was drafted by the Colorado Rockies in the 13th round of the 1998 amateur draft. Player signed June 4, 1998.
- June 9, 1998: Kurt Abbott was traded by the Oakland Athletics to the Colorado Rockies for a player to be named later. The Colorado Rockies sent Ara Petrosian (minors) (June 18, 1998) to the Oakland Athletics to complete the trade.
- July 31, 1998: Ellis Burks was traded by the Colorado Rockies to the San Francisco Giants for Darryl Hamilton, Jim Stoops, and a player to be named later. The San Francisco Giants sent Jason Brester (minors) (August 18, 1998) to the Colorado Rockies to complete the trade.

=== Major League debuts ===
- Batters:
  - Mark Strittmatter (Sep 3)
  - Derrick Gibson (Sep 8)
  - Edgard Clemente (Sep 10)
- Pitchers:
  - Mike Saipe (Jun 25)
  - Mark Brownson (Jul 21)
  - Fred Rath, Jr. (Jul 29)
  - Jim Stoops (Sep 9)
  - Lariel González (Sep 22)

=== Roster ===
1998 Colorado Rockies
Roster
| Pitchers: 34 Pedro Astacio; 32 Mark Brownson; 44 Mike DeJean; 45 Jerry DiPoto; 38 Lariel González; 36 Bobby Jones; 57 Darryl Kile; 16 Curtis Leskanic; 23 Chuck McElroy; 43 Mike Munoz; 53 Fred Rath, Jr.; 30 Kevin Ritz; 20 Mike Saipe; 39 Jim Stoops; 29 Mark Thompson; 52 John Thomson; 47 Dave Veres; 41 Dave Wainhouse; 21 Jamey Wright | Catchers: 8 Kirt Manwaring; 15 Jeff Reed; 22 Mark Strittmatter; Infielders: 6 Jason Bates; 9 Vinny Castilla; 28 Greg Colbrunn; 17 Todd Helton; 3 Mike Lansing; 22 Nelson Liriano; 5 Neifi Pérez; 28 Terry Shumpert | Outfielders: 7 Kurt Abbott; 24 Jeff Barry; 10 Dante Bichette; 26 Ellis Burks; 19 Edgard Clemente; 11 Angel Echevarria; 24 Derrick Gibson; 1 Curtis Goodwin; 12 Darryl Hamilton; 35 John Vander Wal; 33 Larry Walker; 19 Derrick White | Manager: 25 Don Baylor; Coaches: 49 Frank Funk (pitching); 2 Gene Glynn (third base); 50 Bill Hayes (bullpen); 13 Clint Hurdle (hitting/first base); 4 Jackie Moore (bench) |

== Player stats ==
| = Indicates team leader |

| = Indicates league leader |

=== Batting ===
==== Starters by position ====
Note: Pos = Position; G = Games played; AB = At bats; H = Hits; Avg. = Batting average; HR = Home runs; RBI = Runs batted in

| Pos | Player | G | AB | H | Avg. | HR | RBI | SB |
|---|---|---|---|---|---|---|---|---|
| C | Kirt Manwaring | 110 | 291 | 72 | .247 | 2 | 26 | 1 |
| 1B | Todd Helton | 152 | 530 | 167 | .315 | 25 | 97 | 3 |
| 2B | Mike Lansing | 153 | 584 | 161 | .276 | 12 | 66 | 10 |
| SS | Neifi Pérez | 162 | 647 | 177 | .274 | 9 | 59 | 5 |
| 3B | Vinny Castilla | 162 | 645 | 206 | .319 | 46 | 144 | 5 |
| LF | Dante Bichette | 161 | 662 | 219 | .331 | 22 | 122 | 14 |
| CF | Ellis Burks | 100 | 357 | 102 | .286 | 16 | 54 | 3 |
| RF | Larry Walker | 130 | 454 | 165 | .363 | 23 | 67 | 14 |

==== Other batters ====
Note: G = Games played; AB = At bats; H = Hits; Avg. = Batting average; HR = Home runs; RBI = Runs batted in

| Player | G | AB | H | Avg. | HR | RBI | SB |
|---|---|---|---|---|---|---|---|
| Kurt Abbott | 42 | 71 | 18 | .254 | 3 | 15 | 0 |
| Jeff Barry | 15 | 34 | 6 | .176 | 0 | 2 | 0 |
| Jason Bates | 53 | 74 | 14 | .189 | 0 | 3 | 0 |
| Edgard Clemente | 11 | 17 | 6 | .353 | 0 | 2 | 0 |
| Greg Colbrunn | 62 | 122 | 38 | .311 | 2 | 13 | 3 |
| Angel Echevarria | 19 | 29 | 11 | .379 | 1 | 9 | 0 |
| Curtis Goodwin | 119 | 159 | 39 | .245 | 1 | 6 | 5 |
| Darryl Hamilton | 51 | 194 | 65 | .335 | 5 | 25 | 4 |
| Nelson Liriano | 12 | 17 | 0 | .000 | 0 | 0 | 0 |
| Jeff Reed | 113 | 259 | 75 | .290 | 9 | 39 | 0 |
| Terry Shumpert | 23 | 26 | 6 | .231 | 1 | 2 | 0 |
| Mark Strittmatter | 4 | 4 | 0 | .000 | 0 | 0 | 0 |
| John Vander Wal | 89 | 104 | 30 | .288 | 5 | 20 | 0 |
| Derrick White | 9 | 9 | 0 | .000 | 0 | 0 | 0 |

=== Pitching ===
==== Starting pitchers ====
Note: G = Games pitched; IP = Innings pitched; W = Wins; L = Losses; ERA = Earned run average; SO = Strikeouts

| Player | G | IP | W | L | ERA | SO |
|---|---|---|---|---|---|---|
| Darryl Kile | 36 | 230.1 | 13 | 17 | 5.20 | 158 |
| Pedro Astacio | 35 | 209.1 | 13 | 14 | 6.23 | 170 |
| Jamey Wright | 34 | 206.1 | 9 | 14 | 5.67 | 86 |
| John Thomson | 26 | 161.0 | 8 | 11 | 4.81 | 106 |
| Mark Thompson | 6 | 23.1 | 1 | 2 | 7.71 | 14 |
| Mark Brownson | 2 | 13.1 | 1 | 0 | 4.73 | 8 |
| Mike Saipe | 2 | 10.0 | 0 | 1 | 10.80 | 2 |
| Kevin Ritz | 2 | 9.0 | 0 | 2 | 11.00 | 3 |

==== Other pitchers ====
Note: G = Games pitched; IP = Innings pitched; W = Wins; L = Losses; ERA = Earned run average; SO = Strikeouts; SV = Saves

| Player | G | IP | W | L | ERA | SO | SV |
|---|---|---|---|---|---|---|---|
| Bobby Jones | 35 | 141.1 | 7 | 8 | 5.22 | 109 | 0 |

==== Relief pitchers ====
Note: G = Games pitched; W = Wins; L = Losses; SV = Saves; ERA = Earned run average; SO = Strikeouts

| Player | G | IP | W | L | ERA | SO | SV |
|---|---|---|---|---|---|---|---|
| Jerry DiPoto | 68 | 71.1 | 3 | 4 | 3.53 | 49 | 19 |
| Chuck McElroy | 78 | 68.1 | 6 | 4 | 2.90 | 61 | 2 |
| Curtis Leskanic | 66 | 75.2 | 6 | 4 | 4.40 | 55 | 2 |
| Dave Veres | 63 | 76.1 | 3 | 1 | 2.83 | 74 | 8 |
| Mike DeJean | 59 | 74.1 | 3 | 1 | 3.03 | 27 | 2 |
| Mike Munoz | 40 | 41.1 | 2 | 2 | 5.66 | 24 | 3 |
| Dave Wainhouse | 10 | 11.0 | 1 | 0 | 4.91 | 3 | 0 |
| Fred Rath | 2 | 5.1 | 0 | 0 | 1.69 | 2 | 0 |
| Jim Stoops | 3 | 4.0 | 1 | 0 | 2.25 | 0 | 0 |
| Lariel Gonzalez | 1 | 1.0 | 0 | 0 | 0.00 | 0 | 0 |

== Game log ==
1998 Game Log
March (1-0)

| # | Date | Opponent | Score | Win | Loss | Save | Attendance | Record |
|---|---|---|---|---|---|---|---|---|
| 1 | March 31 | @ Diamondbacks | 9–2 | Kile (1–0) | Benes (0–1) | | 47,484 | 1–0 |

April (11-16)

| # | Date | Opponent | Score | Win | Loss | Save | Attendance | Record |
|---|---|---|---|---|---|---|---|---|
| 2 | April 1 | @ Diamondbacks | 6–0 | Thomson (1–0) | Blair (0–1) | | 43,758 | 2–0 |
| 3 | April 2 | @ Diamondbacks | 6–4 | Astacio (1–0) | Anderson (0–1) | DiPoto (1) | 42,876 | 3–0 |
| 4 | April 3 | @ Astros | 15–2 | Lima (1–0) | Wright (0–1) | | 26,026 | 3–1 |
| 5 | April 4 | @ Astros | 5–3 | Thompson (1–0) | Bergman (0–1) | DiPoto (2) | 21,325 | 4–1 |
| 6 | April 5 | @ Astros | 6–2 | Reynolds (1–0) | Kile (1–1) | | 21,037 | 4–2 |
| 7 | April 6 | @ Astros | 13–4 | Hampton (1–0) | Thomson (1–1) | | 13,553 | 4–3 |
| 8 | April 7 | Cardinals | 12–11 | Politte (1–0) | Astacio (1–1) | Bottenfield (2) | 48,016 | 4–4 |
| 9 | April 8 | Cardinals | 13–9 | Aybar (1–1) | Wright (0–2) | | 48,020 | 4–5 |
| 10 | April 9 | Cardinals | 7–5 | Busby (1–0) | Leskanic (0–1) | Brantley (1) | 46,579 | 4–6 |
| 11 | April 10 | Reds | 18–7 | Jordan (1–0) | Kile (1–2) | Sullivan (1) | 48,013 | 4–7 |
| 12 | April 11 | Reds | 12–5 | Remlinger (1–2) | Thomson (1–2) | Belinda (1) | 48,053 | 4–8 |
| 13 | April 12 | Reds | 10–4 | Harnisch (1–0) | Astacio (1–2) | | 46,921 | 4–9 |
| 14 | April 13 | Reds | 8–4 | Leskanic (1–1) | Belinda (0–1) | | 44,488 | 5–9 |
| 15 | April 14 | Dodgers | 6–3 | DeJean (1–0) | Valdez (1–2) | DiPoto (3) | 44,337 | 6–9 |
| 16 | April 16 | Dodgers | 4–3 (10) | Radinsky (1–0) | DiPoto (0–1) | Bruske (1) | 38,429 | 6–10 |
| 17 | April 18 | Braves | 11–4 | Neagle (2–1) | Astacio (1–3) | | 48,058 | 6–11 |
| 18 | April 19 | Braves | 5–3 | Millwood (3–0) | Thompson (1–1) | Wohlers (5) | 48,038 | 6–12 |
| 19 | April 19 | Braves | 10–7 | Wright (1–2) | Martínez (1–2) | DiPoto (4) | 43,977 | 7–12 |
| 20 | April 20 | Braves | 7–5 | Maddux (2–1) | Kile (1–3) | Ligtenberg (1) | 43,594 | 7–13 |
| 21 | April 22 | @ Marlins | 3–2 | Powell (1–2) | Leskanic (1–2) | | 16,405 | 7–14 |
| 22 | April 23 | @ Marlins | 4–3 | DiPoto (1–1) | Stanifer (0–1) | | 15,098 | 8–14 |
| 23 | April 24 | @ Marlins | 5–1 | Meadows (3–2) | Thompson (1–2) | | 21,708 | 8–15 |
| 24 | April 25 | @ Braves | 11–7 | Kile (2–3) | Millwood (3–1) | | 49,161 | 9–15 |
| 25 | April 26 | @ Braves | 7–6 | Wright (2–2) | Maddux (2–2) | DiPoto (5) | 42,400 | 10–15 |
| 26 | April 27 | Marlins | 5–4 (10) | Powell (2–2) | Leskanic (1–3) | Alfonseca (1) | 48,048 | 10–16 |
| 27 | April 28 | Marlins | 8–7 | Astacio (2–3) | Larkin (1–1) | Leskanic (1) | 47,346 | 11–16 |
| 28 | April 30 | @ Mets | 4–0 | Kile (3–3) | Jones (1–3) | | 12,599 | 12–16 |

May (12-16)

| # | Date | Opponent | Score | Win | Loss | Save | Attendance | Record |
|---|---|---|---|---|---|---|---|---|
| 29 | May 2 | @ Mets | 7–3 | Leskanic (2–3) | Cook (2–1) | | 19,968 | 13–16 |
| 30 | May 3 | @ Mets | 5–2 | Reed (2–2) | Astacio (2–4) | | 19,493 | 13–17 |
| 31 | May 4 | @ Phillies | 11–2 | Thomson (2–2) | Stephenson (0–2) | | 11,403 | 14–17 |
| 32 | May 5 | @ Phillies | 6–1 | Kile (4–3) | Grace (1–4) | | 13,672 | 15–17 |
| 33 | May 6 | @ Phillies | 7–6 (10) | Leiter (2–0) | McElroy (0–1) | | 19,538 | 15–18 |
| 34 | May 7 | @ Expos | 2–1 | Pérez (1–3) | Wright (2–3) | Urbina (7) | 7,075 | 15–19 |
| 35 | May 8 | @ Expos | 7–5 | Astacio (3–4) | Hermanson (3–3) | DiPoto (6) | 11,725 | 16–19 |
| 36 | May 9 | @ Expos | 4–0 | Moore (2–4) | Thomson (2–3) | Urbina (8) | 12,014 | 16–20 |
| 37 | May 10 | @ Expos | 5–3 | Kile (5–3) | Kline (1–2) | DiPoto (7) | 10,041 | 17–20 |
| 38 | May 11 | @ Pirates | 5–2 | Schmidt (5–1) | Ritz (0–1) | | 9,498 | 17–21 |
| 39 | May 12 | @ Pirates | 6–0 | Loaiza (2–1) | Wright (2–4) | | 12,954 | 17–22 |
| 40 | May 13 | Cubs | 9–3 | Trachsel (4–1) | Astacio (3–5) | | 48,038 | 17–23 |
| 41 | May 14 | Cubs | 9–7 | Tapani (5–2) | Thomson (2–4) | Beck (12) | 48,077 | 17–24 |
| 42 | May 15 | Brewers | 8–5 | Woodard (3–1) | Kile (5–4) | Myers (1) | 48,035 | 17–25 |
| 43 | May 16 | Brewers | 7–5 | Karl (5–1) | Ritz (0–2) | Jones (11) | 48,063 | 17–26 |
| 44 | May 17 | Brewers | 2–1 | Wright (3–4) | Woodall (0–1) | DiPoto (8) | 48,041 | 18–26 |
| 45 | May 18 | Brewers | 8–5 | Astacio (4–5) | Juden (5–2) | DiPoto (9) | 48,026 | 19–26 |
| 46 | May 20 | @ Braves | 5–1 | Millwood (6–1) | Thomson (2–5) | | 33,531 | 19–27 |
| 47 | May 21 | @ Braves | 2–0 | Neagle (6–1) | Kile (5–5) | Ligtenberg (6) | 34,611 | 19–28 |
| 48 | May 22 | @ Reds | 3–2 | Wright (4–4) | Weathers (2–4) | DiPoto (10) | 21,410 | 20–28 |
| 49 | May 23 | @ Reds | 4–1 (7) | Winchester (3–2) | Astacio (4–6) | | 20,034 | 20–29 |
| 50 | May 24 | @ Reds | 3–1 | Jones (1–0) | Tomko (5–3) | DiPoto (11) | 21,298 | 21–29 |
| 51 | May 25 | @ Cardinals | 6–1 | Thomson (3–5) | Busby (5–1) | | 42,038 | 22–29 |
| 52 | May 27 | @ Cardinals | 2–1 | Stottlemyre (6–4) | Kile (5–6) | Brantley (8) | 34,211 | 22–30 |
| 53 | May 28 | @ Cardinals | 4–1 | Mercker (4–3) | Wright (4–5) | King (2) | 37,989 | 22–31 |
| 54 | May 29 | Astros | 7–6 | Hampton (7–2) | Astacio (4–7) | Wagner (14) | 48,325 | 22–32 |
| 55 | May 30 | Astros | 6–3 | Thomson (4–5) | Schourek (2–3) | DiPoto (12) | 48,036 | 23–32 |
| 56 | May 31 | Astros | 7–5 | McElroy (1–1) | Henry (3–2) | | 48,097 | 24–32 |

June (13-15)

| # | Date | Opponent | Score | Win | Loss | Save | Attendance | Record |
|---|---|---|---|---|---|---|---|---|
| 57 | June 1 | Diamondbacks | 6–4 | Benes (4–5) | Kile (5–7) | Olson (7) | 48,020 | 24–33 |
| 58 | June 2 | Diamondbacks | 9–3 | Anderson (3–6) | Wright (4–6) | | 47,905 | 24–34 |
| 59 | June 3 | Diamondbacks | 3–2 | McElroy (2–1) | Olson (1–3) | | 46,279 | 25–24 |
| 60 | June 4 | Diamondbacks | 5–2 | Thomson (5–5) | Daal (1–4) | | 46,295 | 26–34 |
| 61 | June 5 | @ Angels | 5–0 | Dickson (5–4) | Jones (1–1) | | 39,621 | 26–35 |
| 62 | June 6 | @ Angels | 2–1 | Olivares (3–2) | Kile (5–8) | Percival (17) | 38,671 | 26–36 |
| 63 | June 7 | @ Angels | 6–5 | Cadaret (1–0) | DiPoto (1–2) | | 42,493 | 26–37 |
| 64 | June 8 | Rangers | 3–1 | Sele (9–3) | Astacio (4–8) | Wetteland (17) | 48,070 | 26–38 |
| 65 | June 9 | Rangers | 5–2 | Helling (8–3) | Thomson (5–6) | Wetteland (18) | 48,068 | 26–39 |
| 66 | June 10 | Rangers | 9–8 (10) | DiPoto (2–2) | Gunderson (0–1) | | 48,061 | 27–39 |
| 67 | June 12 | @ Dodgers | 2–1 | Mlicki (2–4) | Kile (5–9) | McMichael (1) | 39,163 | 27–40 |
| 68 | June 13 | @ Dodgers | 4–2 | Wright (5–6) | Dreifort (4–6) | DiPoto (13) | 38,417 | 28–40 |
| 69 | June 14 | @ Dodgers | 3–2 (12) | DeJean (2–0) | Radinsky (2–3) | McElroy (1) | 41,964 | 29–40 |
| 70 | June 15 | @ Giants | 4–3 (12) | Leskanic (3–3) | Johnstone (2–3) | DiPoto (14) | 16,891 | 30–40 |
| 71 | June 16 | @ Giants | 5–3 | Tavárez (3–3) | Jones (1–2) | Nen (20) | 12,585 | 30–41 |
| 72 | June 17 | @ Giants | 6–3 | Rueter (8–3) | Kile (5–10) | Nen (21) | 19,125 | 30–42 |
| 73 | June 18 | Dodgers | 5–0 | Mlicki (3–4) | Wright (5–7) | | 48,092 | 30–43 |
| 74 | June 19 | Dodgers | 4–3 (10) | Osuna (3–0) | DiPoto (2–3) | | 48,120 | 30–44 |
| 75 | June 20 | Dodgers | 7–6 | Munoz (1–0) | Reyes (0–3) | Veres (1) | 48,231 | 31–44 |
| 76 | June 21 | Dodgers | 11–6 | Jones (2–2) | Park (5–5) | | 48,186 | 32–44 |
| 77 | June 22 | @ Brewers | 3–2 | Reyes (3–0) | McElroy (2–2) | Wickman (7) | 22,556 | 32–45 |
| 78 | June 23 | @ Brewers | 7–5 | Patrick (3–0) | Wright (5–8) | Wickman (8) | 20,759 | 32–46 |
| 79 | June 24 | Astros | 8–6 | Astacio (5–8) | Bergman (6–4) | Veres (2) | 48,150 | 33–46 |
| 80 | June 25 | Astros | 6–5 (12) | Leskanic (4–3) | Magnante (3–2) | | 48,046 | 34–46 |
| 81 | June 26 | Athletics | 12–6 | Munoz (2–0) | Oquist (4–5) | | 48,069 | 35–46 |
| 82 | June 27 | Athletics | 8–6 | Mathews (4–4) | DiPoto (2–4) | Taylor (16) | 48,049 | 35–47 |
| 83 | June 28 | Athletics | 11–10 | DeJean (3–0) | Fetters (0–2) | Veres (3) | 48,013 | 36–47 |
| 84 | June 30 | @ Mariners | 6–4 | Astacio (6–8) | Johnson (7–7) | Munoz (1) | 28,821 | 37–47 |

July (11-14)

| # | Date | Opponent | Score | Win | Loss | Save | Attendance | Record |
|---|---|---|---|---|---|---|---|---|
| 85 | July 1 | @ Mariners | 9–5 | Cloude (4–7) | Saipe (0–1) | | 25,551 | 37–48 |
| 86 | July 2 | @ Mariners | 10–3 | Swift (8–4) | Kile (5–11) | | 32,523 | 37–49 |
| 87 | July 3 | @ Padres | 4–2 | Hamilton (6–9) | DeJean (3–1) | Hoffman (25) | 40,588 | 37–50 |
| 88 | July 4 | @ Padres | 9–1 | Langston (3–1) | Jones (2–3) | | 61,148 | 37–51 |
| 89 | July 5 | @ Padres | 7–2 | Ashby (11–5) | Astacio (6–9) | | 32,649 | 37–52 |
| 90 | July 10 | Giants | 11–2 | Kile (6–11) | Estes (7–8) | | 48,174 | 38–52 |
| 91 | July 11 | Giants | 5–4 | McElroy (3–2) | Hershiser (7–7) | Munoz (2) | 48,262 | 39–52 |
| 92 | July 12 | Giants | 5–3 | Astacio (7–9) | Rueter (10–4) | Munoz (3) | 48,334 | 40–52 |
| 93 | July 13 | Padres | 9–5 | Jones (3–3) | Hitchcock (4–3) | | 48,098 | 41–52 |
| 94 | July 14 | Padres | 8–7 | Sanders (1–2) | Kile (6–12) | Hoffman (28) | 48,114 | 41–53 |
| 95 | July 15 | Padres | 6–2 | Brown (11–3) | Wright (5–9) | | 48,369 | 41–54 |
| 96 | July 17 | @ Diamondbacks | 9–6 | Blair (4–13) | Astacio (7–10) | Olson (13) | 46,322 | 41–55 |
| 97 | July 18 | @ Diamondbacks | 4–2 | Anderson (7–8) | Jones (3–4) | Olson (14) | 48,527 | 41–56 |
| 98 | July 19 | @ Diamondbacks | 6–4 | Small (2–1) | Munoz (2–1) | Embree (1) | 45,650 | 41–57 |
| 99 | July 20 | @ Astros | 10–9 | Henry (6–2) | Veres (0–1) | | 25,491 | 41–58 |
| 100 | July 21 | @ Astros | 5–0 | Brownson (1–0) | Hampton (8–5) | | 28,718 | 42–58 |
| 101 | July 23 | Reds | 6–4 | Astacio (8–10) | Remlinger (6–11) | Veres (4) | 42,586 | 43–58 |
| 102 | July 23 | Reds | 6–4 | Jones (4–4) | Harnisch (7–5) | Leskanic (2) | 45,705 | 44–58 |
| 103 | July 24 | Cardinals | 12–3 | Kile (7–12) | Stottlemyre (9–9) | | 48,303 | 45–58 |
| 104 | July 25 | Cardinals | 5–2 | McElroy (4–2) | Morris (1–1) | DeJean (1) | 48,323 | 46–58 |
| 105 | July 26 | Cardinals | 3–1 | Mercker (6–8) | Thomson (5–7) | Croushore (7) | 48,288 | 46–59 |
| 106 | July 27 | Pirates | 8–7 (13) | Leskanic (5–3) | McCurry (0–1) | | 46,024 | 47–59 |
| 107 | July 28 | Pirates | 12–6 | Astacio (9–10) | Lieber (8–11) | | 46,856 | 48–59 |
| 108 | July 29 | Pirates | 12–1 | Peters (5–8) | Kile (7–13) | | 47,411 | 48–60 |
| 109 | July 31 | @ Cubs | 9–1 | Wood (11–5) | Wright (5–10) | Mulholland (3) | 40,490 | 48–61 |

August (15-14)

| # | Date | Opponent | Score | Win | Loss | Save | Attendance | Record |
|---|---|---|---|---|---|---|---|---|
| 110 | August 1 | @ Cubs | 3–2 | Trachsel (11–5) | Thomson (5–8) | Beck (32) | 40,198 | 48–62 |
| 111 | August 2 | @ Cubs | 6–3 | Astacio (10–10) | Clark (6–11) | McElroy (2) | 39,427 | 49–62 |
| 112 | August 3 | @ Pirates | 7–2 | Jones (5–4) | Lieber (8–12) | | 11,204 | 50–62 |
| 113 | August 4 | @ Pirates | 13–5 | Christiansen (2–2) | Kile (7–14) | | 15,784 | 50–63 |
| 114 | August 5 | @ Pirates | 6–2 | Wright (6–10) | Córdova (9–10) | | 12,862 | 51–63 |
| 115 | August 6 | @ Pirates | 5–1 | Thomson (6–8) | Schmidt (8–9) | | 14,060 | 52–63 |
| 116 | August 7 | Mets | 8–7 | Reed (13–7) | Astacio (10–11) | Franco (22) | 48,365 | 52–64 |
| 117 | August 8 | Mets | 4–3 | Reynoso (3–0) | Jones (5–5) | Franco (23) | 48,312 | 52–65 |
| 118 | August 9 | Mets | 11–4 | Kile (8–14) | Nomo (5–9) | | 48,014 | 53–65 |
| 119 | August 10 | Expos | 6–2 | Wright (7–10) | Telford (3–5) | | 44,768 | 54–65 |
| 120 | August 11 | Expos | 15–6 | Thomson (7–8) | Powell (1–2) | | 45,403 | 55–65 |
| 121 | August 12 | Expos | 3–2 | Astacio (11–11) | Vázquez (3–12) | DiPoto (15) | 46,872 | 56–65 |
| 122 | August 14 | Phillies | 6–2 | Loewer (6–4) | Jones (5–6) | | 47,395 | 56–66 |
| 123 | August 15 | Phillies | 7–3 | Kile (9–14) | Gomes (9–4) | | 48,329 | 57–66 |
| 124 | August 16 | Phillies | 8–7 | Portugal (7–3) | Wright (7–11) | Leiter (22) | 48,024 | 57–67 |
| 125 | August 18 | @ Mets | 6–2 | Leiter (12–4) | Astacio (11–12) | | | 57–68 |
| 126 | August 18 | @ Mets | 6–3 | Rojas (5–2) | McElroy (4–3) | Franco (26) | 21,611 | 57–69 |
| 127 | August 19 | @ Mets | 2–1 | Yoshii (5–6) | Jones (5–7) | Franco (27) | 19,395 | 57–70 |
| 128 | August 20 | @ Expos | 6–3 | Kile (10–14) | Thurman (2–2) | DeJean (2) | 11,680 | 58–70 |
| 129 | August 21 | @ Expos | 3–2 | Veres (1–1) | Urbina (4–3) | | 11,626 | 59–70 |
| 130 | August 22 | @ Phillies | 6–1 | Byrd (2–0) | Astacio (11–13) | | 23,435 | 59–71 |
| 131 | August 23 | @ Phillies | 5–2 | Thomson (8–8) | Grace (4–7) | DiPoto (16) | 26,364 | 60–71 |
| 132 | August 24 | @ Phillies | 3–1 | Jones (6–7) | Loewer (6–5) | Veres (5) | 15,665 | 61–71 |
| 133 | August 25 | Brewers | 11–6 | Veres (2–1) | Weathers (4–5) | | 44,573 | 62–71 |
| 134 | August 26 | Brewers | 6–5 | Pulsipher (2–1) | Wright (7–12) | | 42,395 | 62–72 |
| 135 | August 27 | Cubs | 11–10 (10) | Mulholland (4–5) | Munoz (2–2) | Beck (38) | 50,093 | 62–73 |
| 136 | August 28 | Cubs | 10–5 | Trachsel (14–7) | Thomson (8–9) | | 48,223 | 62–74 |
| 137 | August 29 | Cubs | 7–3 | Jones (7–7) | Clark (7–13) | | 48,269 | 63–74 |
| 138 | August 30 | Cubs | 4–3 | Tapani (16–7) | Kile (10–15) | Beck (39) | 48,255 | 63–75 |

September (14-10)

| # | Date | Opponent | Score | Win | Loss | Save | Attendance | Record |
|---|---|---|---|---|---|---|---|---|
| 139 | September 1 | @ Brewers | 12–3 | Wright (8–12) | Pulsipher (2–2) | | 13,347 | 64–75 |
| 140 | September 2 | @ Brewers | 8–4 | Roque (3–1) | Astacio (11–14) | | 10,584 | 64–76 |
| 141 | September 3 | @ Brewers | 7–3 | Woodall (7–8) | Thomson (8–10) | | 12,327 | 64–77 |
| 142 | September 4 | Padres | 11–5 | Veres (3–1) | Sanders (2–3) | | 44,596 | 65–77 |
| 143 | September 5 | Padres | 4–2 | Brown (18–5) | Kile (10–16) | Hoffman (46) | 42,930 | 65–78 |
| 144 | September 6 | Padres | 12–2 | Wright (9–12) | Hamilton (12–12) | | 46,240 | 66–78 |
| 145 | September 7 | Marlins | 15–10 | Leskanic (6–3) | Ludwick (1–4) | | 41,094 | 67–78 |
| 146 | September 8 | Marlins | 11–10 | McElroy (5–3) | Mantei (3–4) | | 40,047 | 68–78 |
| 147 | September 9 | Marlins | 9–8 | McElroy (6–3) | Speier (0–3) | | 40,500 | 69–78 |
| 148 | September 10 | Marlins | 3–1 | Kile (11–16) | Medina (1–4) | | 44,906 | 70–78 |
| 149 | September 11 | @ Giants | 7–6 | Stoops (1–0) | Morman (0–2) | DiPoto (17) | 34,698 | 71–78 |
| 150 | September 12 | @ Giants | 1–0 | Astacio (12–14) | Nen (7–6) | DiPoto (18) | 30,422 | 72–78 |
| 151 | September 13 | @ Giants | 4–3 | Johnstone (4–5) | McElroy (6–4) | Nen (36) | 30,278 | 72–79 |
| 152 | September 14 | @ Dodgers | 4–1 | Pérez (10–13) | Jones (7–8) | | 26,122 | 72–80 |
| 153 | September 15 | @ Dodgers | 5–4 | Kile (12–16) | Park (13–9) | DiPoto (19) | 29,702 | 73–80 |
| 154 | September 16 | @ Dodgers | 2–0 | Bohanon (7–10) | Wright (9–13) | Shaw (44) | 27,906 | 73–81 |
| 155 | September 18 | @ Padres | 4–1 | Astacio (13–14) | Ashby (16–9) | Veres (6) | 28,158 | 74–81 |
| 156 | September 19 | @ Padres | 4–1 | Clement (1–0) | Thomson (8–11) | Hoffman (51) | 54,042 | 74–82 |
| 157 | September 20 | @ Padres | 1–0 (11) | Kile (13–16) | Myers (4–6) | Veres (7) | 37,939 | 75–82 |
| 158 | September 22 | Diamondbacks | 8–6 | Daal (8–12) | Wright (9–14) | Olson (29) | 42,859 | 75–83 |
| 159 | September 23 | Diamondbacks | 14–11 | Wainhouse (1–0) | Banks (2–3) | Veres (8) | 44,021 | 76–83 |
| 160 | September 25 | Giants | 8–6 | Johnstone (6–5) | Leskanic (6–4) | Nen (40) | 48,147 | 76–84 |
| 161 | September 26 | Giants | 8–4 | Hershiser (11–10) | Kile (13–17) | | 47,462 | 76–85 |
| 162 | September 27 | Giants | 9–8 | DiPoto (3–4) | Nen (7–7) | | 48,028 | 77–85 |

== Awards, league leaders and accomplishments ==
=== National League leaders ===
- Batting champion: Larry Walker (.363) ^{†}
- Games played: Vinny Castilla (162)
- Hits: Dante Bichette (219) ^{†}
- Sacrifice hits: Neifi Pérez (22) ^{†}
- Notes: ^{†} – led MLB. References:

=== Awards ===
- Colorado Rockies Player of the Year: Vinny Castilla
- ESPY Award for Best Major League Player: Larry Walker
- Lionel Conacher Award: Larry Walker
- Lou Marsh Trophy: Larry Walker
- Rawlings Gold Glove Award at outfield: Larry Walker
- Silver Slugger at third base: Vinny Castilla
- Sporting News National League Rookie of the Year: Todd Helton
- Tip O'Neill Award: Larry Walker
- Topps All-Star Rookie team: Todd Helton

All-Star Game

- Larry Walker, Outfield, Starter
- Vinny Castilla, Third Base, Reserve
- Dante Bichette, Outfield, Reserve

== Farm system ==
| Level | Team | League | Manager |
|---|---|---|---|
| AAA | Colorado Springs Sky Sox | Pacific Coast League | Paul Zuvella |
| AA | New Haven Ravens | Eastern League | Tim Blackwell |
| A | Salem Avalanche | Carolina League | Jay Loviglio |
| A | Asheville Tourists | South Atlantic League | Ron Gideon |
| A-Short Season | Portland Rockies | Northwest League | Jim Eppard |
| Rookie | AZL Rockies | Arizona League | P. J. Carey |

LEAGUE CHAMPIONS: AZL Rockies

== See also ==
- List of Gold Glove Award winners at outfield
- List of Major League Baseball batting champions
- List of Silver Slugger Award winners at third base

Records
| Preceded by 1997 | Colorado Rockies seasons 1998 | Succeeded by 1999 |
