= 1998 St. Louis Cardinals season =

Major League Baseball season

1998 St. Louis Cardinals
- League: National League
- Division: Central
- Ballpark: Busch Memorial Stadium
- City: St. Louis, Missouri
- Record: 83–79 (.512)
- Divisional place: 3rd
- Owners: William DeWitt, Jr.
- General managers: Walt Jocketty
- Managers: Tony La Russa
- Television: Fox Sports Midwest; Joe Buck, (Al Hrabosky, Bob Ramsey); KPLR (Bob Carpenter, Bob Ramsey, Rich Gould)
- Radio: KMOX (Jack Buck, Mike Shannon, Joe Buck)

The 1998 St. Louis Cardinals season was the team's 117th season in St. Louis, Missouri and the 107th season in the National League. The Cardinals went 83–79 during the season and finished third in the National League Central division, 18 games behind the Houston Astros. First baseman Mark McGwire broke Roger Maris' single-season home run record this season by hitting 70 home runs, battling with the Chicago Cubs' Sammy Sosa, who finished runner-up in the National League with 66.

== Offseason ==
- December 5: Signed free agent outfielder Willie McGee.
- January 8: Signed free agent pitcher Kent Bottenfield.
- March 30: Traded Craig Shipley to the Anaheim Angels for Chip Hale.

== Regular season ==
- On May 8, McGwire hit career home run number 400 in his 4,726th at bat, faster than any other player in history who reached 400 home runs.
- Facing Liván Hernández on May 16, McGwire hit his longest home run of the season, estimated at 545 feet.
- McGwire hit home run number 50 of the season on August 20, becoming the first Major League ballplayer in history with three consecutive 50-plus home run seasons.
- McGwire broke Roger Maris' 37-year-old record of 61 home runs on September 8 with a low line drive over Busch Stadium's left field fence. Known for hitting many long home runs, it was ironically the shortest home run McGwire hit that season.

=== Opening Day lineup ===
- Royce Clayton, SS
- Delino DeShields, 2B
- Mark McGwire, 1B
- Ray Lankford, OF
- Brian Jordan, OF
- Ron Gant, OF
- Gary Gaetti, 3B
- Tom Lampkin, C
- Todd Stottlemyre, P

=== Season standings ===
NL Central
| Team | W | L | Pct. | GB | Home | Road |
|---|---|---|---|---|---|---|
| Houston Astros | 102 | 60 | .630 | — | 55‍–‍26 | 47‍–‍34 |
| Chicago Cubs | 90 | 73 | .552 | 12½ | 51‍–‍31 | 39‍–‍42 |
| St. Louis Cardinals | 83 | 79 | .512 | 19 | 48‍–‍34 | 35‍–‍45 |
| Cincinnati Reds | 77 | 85 | .475 | 25 | 39‍–‍42 | 38‍–‍43 |
| Milwaukee Brewers | 74 | 88 | .457 | 28 | 38‍–‍43 | 36‍–‍45 |
| Pittsburgh Pirates | 69 | 93 | .426 | 33 | 40‍–‍40 | 29‍–‍53 |

=== Record vs. opponents ===
1998 National League record Source: MLB Standings Grid – 1998
| Team | AZ | ATL | CHC | CIN | COL | FLA | HOU | LAD | MIL | MON | NYM | PHI | PIT | SD | SF | STL | AL |
|---|---|---|---|---|---|---|---|---|---|---|---|---|---|---|---|---|---|
| Arizona | — | 1–8 | 5–7 | 4–5 | 6–6 | 6–2 | 4–5 | 4–8 | 6–3 | 2–7 | 4–5 | 2–7 | 6–3 | 3–9 | 5–7 | 2–7 | 5–8 |
| Atlanta | 8–1 | — | 3–6 | 7–2 | 5–3 | 7–5 | 4–5 | 8–1 | 7–2 | 6–6 | 9–3 | 8–4 | 7–2 | 5–4 | 7–2 | 6–3 | 9–7 |
| Chicago | 7–5 | 6–3 | — | 6–5 | 7–2 | 7–2 | 4–7 | 4–5 | 6–6 | 7–2 | 4–5 | 3–6 | 8–3 | 5–4 | 7–3 | 4–7 | 5–8 |
| Cincinnati | 5–4 | 2–7 | 5–6 | — | 4–5 | 9–0 | 3–8 | 5–4 | 6–5 | 8–1 | 3–6 | 4–5 | 5–7 | 1–11 | 2–7 | 8–3 | 7-6 |
| Colorado | 6–6 | 3–5 | 2–7 | 5–4 | — | 6–3 | 6–5 | 6–6 | 4–7 | 7–2 | 3–6 | 5–4 | 5–4 | 5–7 | 7–5 | 3–6 | 4–8 |
| Florida | 2–6 | 5–7 | 2–7 | 0–9 | 3–6 | — | 3–6 | 4–5 | 0–9 | 5–7 | 5–7 | 6–6 | 3–6 | 4–5 | 0–9 | 4–5 | 8–8 |
| Houston | 5–4 | 5–4 | 7–4 | 8–3 | 5–6 | 6–3 | — | 3–6 | 9–2 | 7–2 | 5–4 | 7–2 | 9–2 | 5–4 | 6–3 | 5–7 | 10–4 |
| Los Angeles | 8–4 | 1–8 | 5–4 | 4–5 | 6–6 | 5–4 | 6–3 | — | 5–4 | 5–4 | 3–5 | 5–4 | 7–5 | 5–7 | 6–6 | 4–5 | 8–5 |
| Milwaukee | 3–6 | 2–7 | 6–6 | 5–6 | 7–4 | 9–0 | 2–9 | 4–5 | — | 6–3 | 1–8 | 4–5 | 6–5 | 3–6 | 5–4 | 3–8 | 8–6 |
| Montreal | 7–2 | 6–6 | 2–7 | 1–8 | 2–7 | 7–5 | 2–7 | 4–5 | 3–6 | — | 8–4 | 5–7 | 2–7 | 4–4 | 3–6 | 3–6 | 6–10 |
| New York | 5–4 | 3–9 | 5–4 | 6–3 | 6–3 | 7–5 | 4–5 | 5–3 | 8–1 | 4–8 | — | 8–4 | 4–5 | 4–5 | 4–5 | 6–3 | 9–7 |
| Philadelphia | 7-2 | 4–8 | 6–3 | 5–4 | 4–5 | 6–6 | 2–7 | 4–5 | 5–4 | 7–5 | 4–8 | — | 8–1 | 1–8 | 2–6 | 3–6 | 7–9 |
| Pittsburgh | 3–6 | 2–7 | 3–8 | 7–5 | 4–5 | 6–3 | 2–9 | 5–7 | 5–6 | 7–2 | 5–4 | 1–8 | — | 5–4 | 2–7 | 6–5 | 6–7 |
| San Diego | 9–3 | 4–5 | 4–5 | 11–1 | 7–5 | 5–4 | 4–5 | 7–5 | 6–3 | 4–4 | 5–4 | 8–1 | 4–5 | — | 8–4 | 6–3 | 6–7 |
| San Francisco | 7–5 | 2–7 | 3–7 | 7–2 | 5–7 | 9–0 | 3–6 | 6–6 | 4–5 | 6–3 | 5–4 | 6–2 | 7–2 | 4–8 | — | 7–5 | 8–5 |
| St. Louis | 7–2 | 3–6 | 7–4 | 3–8 | 6–3 | 5-4 | 7–5 | 5–4 | 8–3 | 6–3 | 3–6 | 6–3 | 5–6 | 3–6 | 5–7 | — | 4–9 |

=== Notable transactions ===
- June 2: Drafted J. D. Drew in the 1st round with the 5th pick of the 1998 amateur draft. Player signed July 3, 1998.
- April 14: The Cleveland Indians selected David Bell off waivers.
- July 31: Traded Todd Stottlemyre and Royce Clayton to the Texas Rangers for Darren Oliver, Fernando Tatís and a player to be named later. The Rangers sent Mark Little on August 9 to the Cardinals to complete the trade.
- August 16: Released catcher Tom Pagnozzi.

=== Scorecard for McGwire's 70th ===
Entering the game on September 27 against the Montreal Expos, McGwire had 68 home runs. In the third inning, McGwire hit a home run off of Mike Thurman, and in the seventh, he got number 70 off of Carl Pavano. The ball was caught by Philip Ozersky. In January 1999, Todd McFarlane purchased Mark McGwire's 70th home run ball from the 1998 season for a record $3 million.

September 27, Busch Stadium, St. Louis, Missouri

| Team | 1 | 2 | 3 | 4 | 5 | 6 | 7 | 8 | 9 | R | H | E |
|---|---|---|---|---|---|---|---|---|---|---|---|---|
| Montreal | 0 | 0 | 2 | 1 | 0 | 0 | 0 | 0 | 0 | 3 | 9 | 1 |
| St. Louis | 1 | 1 | 1 | 0 | 0 | 0 | 3 | 0 | x | 6 | 9 | 2 |
W: Frascatore (3-4) L: Pavano (6-9) SV: Acevedo (15) HRs: Cabrera (3), Tatis (8), McGwire 2 (69, 70)
Attendance: 46,110 Time:2:33 U-HP–Rich Rieker, 1B–Joe West, 2B–Kerwin Danley, 3B–Brian Gorman

=== Aftermath of the 1998 home run chase ===
A section of Interstate 70 running through downtown St. Louis was renamed "The Mark McGwire Highway." His record stood until Barry Bonds hit 73 in 2001. In years following, revelations of the anabolic steroids scandals have possibly tainted these records, but at the time it was great theater and was largely responsible for drawing many fans back to the game after the 1994 players' strike, which had angered and alienated many of them.

=== Roster ===
1998 St. Louis Cardinals
Roster
| Pitchers: 53 Juan Acevedo; 38 Manny Aybar; 37 Kent Bottenfield; 44 Jeff Brantley; 54 Mike Busby; 61 Rich Croushore; 62 Bryan Eversgerd; 50 John Frascatore; 52 José Jiménez; 57 Curtis King; 55 Braden Looper; 34 Sean Lowe; 43 Kent Mercker; 35 Matt Morris; 32 Darren Oliver; 31 Donovan Osborne; 28 Lance Painter; 46 Mark Petkovsek; 40 Cliff Politte; 64 Brady Raggio; 30 Todd Stottlemyre; 36 Bobby Witt | Catchers: 49 Tom Lampkin; 26 Eli Marrero; 19 Tom Pagnozzi; Infielders: 27 David Bell; 11 Royce Clayton; 7 Delino DeShields; 8 Gary Gaetti; 12 Shawn Gilbert; 13 David Howard; 12 Pat Kelly; 48 Joe McEwing; 25 Mark McGwire; 52,23,11 Luis Ordaz; 67,27 Plácido Polanco; 11,23 Fernando Tatís | Outfielders: 8 J. D. Drew; 5 Ron Gant; 21 Brian Hunter; 3 Brian Jordan; 16 Ray Lankford; 58 Mark Little; 47 John Mabry; 51 Willie McGee | Manager: 10 Tony La Russa; Coaches: 18 Dave Duncan (Pitching); 34 Mark DeJohn (Bullpen); 15 Rene Lachemann (Third Base); 4 Carney Lansford (Bench); 39 Dave McKay (First Base); 40 Dave Parker (Hitting) |

== Player stats ==
| = Indicates team leader |

| = Indicates league leader |

=== Batting ===
==== Starters by position ====
Note: Pos = Position; G = Games played; AB = At bats; R = Runs; H = Hits; HR = Home runs; RBI = Runs batted in; Avg. = Batting average; SB = Stolen bases

| Pos | Player | G | AB | R | H | HR | RBI | Avg. | SB |
|---|---|---|---|---|---|---|---|---|---|
| C | Eli Marrero | 83 | 254 | 28 | 62 | 4 | 20 | .244 | 6 |
| 1B | Mark McGwire | 155 | 509 | 130 | 152 | 70 | 147 | .299 | 1 |
| 2B | Delino DeShields | 117 | 420 | 74 | 122 | 7 | 44 | .290 | 26 |
| 3B | Gary Gaetti | 91 | 306 | 39 | 81 | 11 | 43 | .265 | 1 |
| SS | Royce Clayton | 90 | 355 | 59 | 83 | 4 | 29 | .234 | 19 |
| LF | Ron Gant | 121 | 383 | 60 | 92 | 26 | 67 | .240 | 8 |
| CF | Ray Lankford | 154 | 533 | 94 | 156 | 31 | 105 | .293 | 26 |
| RF | Brian Jordan | 150 | 564 | 100 | 178 | 25 | 91 | .316 | 17 |

==== Other batters ====
Note: G = Games played; AB = At bats; R = Runs; H = Hits; HR = Home runs; RBI = Runs batted in; Avg. = Batting average; SB = Stolen bases

| Player | G | AB | R | H | HR | RBI | Avg. | SB |
|---|---|---|---|---|---|---|---|---|
| David Bell | 4 | 9 | 0 | 2 | 0 | 0 | .222 | 0 |
| J. D. Drew | 14 | 36 | 9 | 15 | 5 | 13 | .417 | 0 |
| Shawn Gilbert | 4 | 2 | 0 | 1 | 0 | 0 | .500 | 1 |
| David Howard | 46 | 102 | 15 | 25 | 2 | 12 | .245 | 0 |
| Brian Hunter | 62 | 112 | 11 | 23 | 4 | 13 | .205 | 1 |
| Pat Kelly | 53 | 153 | 18 | 33 | 4 | 14 | .216 | 5 |
| Tom Lampkin | 93 | 216 | 25 | 50 | 6 | 28 | .231 | 3 |
| Mark Little | 7 | 12 | 0 | 1 | 0 | 0 | .083 | 1 |
| John Mabry | 142 | 377 | 41 | 94 | 9 | 46 | .249 | 0 |
| Joe McEwing | 10 | 20 | 5 | 4 | 0 | 1 | .200 | 0 |
| Willie McGee | 120 | 269 | 27 | 68 | 3 | 34 | .253 | 7 |
| Luis Ordaz | 57 | 153 | 9 | 31 | 0 | 8 | .203 | 2 |
| Tom Pagnozzi | 51 | 160 | 7 | 35 | 1 | 10 | .219 | 0 |
| Plácido Polanco | 45 | 114 | 10 | 29 | 1 | 11 | .254 | 2 |
| Fernando Tatís | 55 | 202 | 28 | 58 | 8 | 26 | .287 | 7 |

=== Pitching ===
==== Starting pitchers ====
Note: G = Games pitched; IP = Innings pitched; W = Wins; L = Losses; ERA = Earned run average; SO. = Strikeouts; BB = Bases on balls

| Player | G | IP | W | L | ERA | SO | BB |
|---|---|---|---|---|---|---|---|
| Kent Mercker | 30 | 161.2 | 11 | 11 | 5.07 | 72 | 53 |
| Todd Stottlemyre | 23 | 161.1 | 9 | 9 | 3.51 | 147 | 51 |
| Matt Morris | 17 | 113.2 | 7 | 5 | 2.53 | 79 | 42 |
| Donovan Osborne | 14 | 83.2 | 5 | 4 | 4.09 | 60 | 22 |
| Darren Oliver | 10 | 57.0 | 4 | 4 | 4.26 | 29 | 23 |
| Cliff Politte | 8 | 37.0 | 2 | 3 | 6.32 | 22 | 18 |
| José Jiménez | 4 | 21.1 | 3 | 0 | 2.95 | 12 | 8 |

==== Other pitchers ====
Note: G = Games pitched; IP = Innings pitched; W = Wins; L = Losses; ERA = Earned run average; SO = Strikeouts; BB = Bases on balls

| Player | G | IP | W | L | ERA | SO | BB |
|---|---|---|---|---|---|---|---|
| Kent Bottenfield | 44 | 133.2 | 4 | 6 | 4.44 | 98 | 57 |
| Mark Petkovsek | 48 | 105.2 | 7 | 4 | 4.77 | 55 | 36 |
| Manny Aybar | 20 | 81.1 | 6 | 6 | 5.98 | 57 | 42 |
| Bobby Witt | 17 | 47.1 | 2 | 5 | 4.94 | 28 | 20 |
| Brady Raggio | 4 | 7.0 | 1 | 1 | 15.43 | 3 | 3 |
| Sean Lowe | 4 | 5.1 | 0 | 3 | 15.19 | 2 | 5 |

==== Relief pitchers ====
Note: G = Games pitched; IP = Innings pitched; W = Wins; L = Losses; SV = Saves; ERA = Earned run average; SO = Strikeouts; BB = Bases on balls

| Player | G | IP | W | L | SV | ERA | SO | BB |
|---|---|---|---|---|---|---|---|---|
| Juan Acevedo | 50 | 98.1 | 8 | 3 | 15 | 2.56 | 56 | 29 |
| John Frascatore | 69 | 95.2 | 3 | 4 | 0 | 4.14 | 49 | 36 |
| Lance Painter | 65 | 47.1 | 4 | 0 | 1 | 3.99 | 39 | 28 |
| Jeff Brantley | 48 | 50.2 | 0 | 5 | 14 | 4.44 | 48 | 18 |
| Rich Croushore | 41 | 54.1 | 0 | 3 | 8 | 4.97 | 47 | 29 |
| Curtis King | 36 | 51.0 | 2 | 0 | 2 | 3.53 | 28 | 20 |
| Mike Busby | 26 | 46.0 | 5 | 2 | 0 | 4.50 | 33 | 15 |
| Bryan Eversgerd | 8 | 6.0 | 0 | 0 | 0 | 9.00 | 4 | 2 |
| Braden Looper | 4 | 3.1 | 0 | 1 | 0 | 5.40 | 4 | 1 |
| Gary Gaetti | 1 | 1.0 | 0 | 0 | 0 | 0.00 | 0 | 0 |

== McGwire's 70 ==
| Number | Date | Pitcher | Length |
|---|---|---|---|
| 1 | 03-31-1998 | Ramón Martínez | 364' |
| 2 | 04-02-1998 | Frank Lankford | 368' |
| 3 | 04-03-1998 | Mark Langston | 364' |
| 4 | 04-04-1998 | Don Wengert | 419' |
| 5 | 04-14-1998 | Jeff Suppan | 424' |
| 6 | 04-14-1998 | Jeff Suppan | 347' |
| 7 | 04-14-1998 | Barry Manuel | 462' |
| 8 | 04-17-1998 | Matt Whiteside | 419' |
| 9 | 04-21-1998 | Trey Moore | 437' |
| 10 | 04-25-1998 | Jerry Spradlin | 419' |
| 11 | 04-30-1998 | Marc Pisciotta | 371' |
| 12 | 05-01-1998 | Rod Beck | 362' |
| 13 | 05-08-1998 | Rick Reed | 358' |
| 14 | 05-12-1998 | Paul Wagner | 527' |
| 15 | 05-14-1998 | Kevin Millwood | 381' |
| 16 | 05-16-1998 | Liván Hernández | 545' |
| 17 | 05-18-1998 | Jesús Sánchez | 478' |
| 18 | 05-19-1998 | Tyler Green | 440' |
| 19 | 05-19-1998 | Tyler Green | 471' |
| 20 | 05-19-1998 | Wayne Gomes | 451' |
| 21 | 05-22-1998 | Mark Gardner | 425' |
| 22 | 05-23-1998 | Rich Rodriguez | 366' |
| 23 | 05-23-1998 | John Johnstone | 477' |
| 24 | 05-24-1998 | Robb Nen | 397' |
| 25 | 05-25-1998 | John Thomson | 433' |
| 26 | 05-29-1998 | Dan Miceli | 388' |
| 27 | 05-30-1998 | Andy Ashby | 423' |
| 28 | 06-05-1998 | Orel Hershiser | 409' |
| 29 | 06-08-1998 | Jason Bere | 356' |
| 30 | 06-10-1998 | Jim Parque | 409' |
| 31 | 06-12-1998 | Andy Benes | 438' |
| 32 | 06-17-1998 | José Lima | 437' |
| 33 | 06-18-1998 | Shane Reynolds | 449' |
| 34 | 06-24-1998 | Jaret Wright | 433' |
| 35 | 06-25-1998 | Dave Burba | 461' |
| 36 | 06-27-1998 | Mike Trombley | 431' |
| 37 | 06-30-1998 | Glendon Rusch | 472' |
| 38 | 07-11-1998 | Billy Wagner | 485' |
| 39 | 07-12-1998 | Sean Bergman | 405' |
| 40 | 07-12-1998 | Scott Elarton | 415' |
| 41 | 07-17-1998 | Brian Bohanon | 511' |
| 42 | 07-17-1998 | Antonio Osuna | 425' |
| 43 | 07-20-1998 | Brian Boehringer | 452' |
| 44 | 07-26-1998 | John Thomson | 452' |
| 45 | 07-28-1998 | Mike Myers | 408' |
| 46 | 08-08-1998 | Mark Clark | 374' |
| 47 | 08-11-1998 | Bobby Jones | 464' |
| 48 | 08-19-1998 | Matt Karchner | 398' |
| 49 | 08-19-1998 | Terry Mulholland | 409' |
| 50 | 08-20-1998 | Willie Blair | 369' |
| 51 | 08-20-1998 | Rick Reed | 393' |
| 52 | 08-22-1998 | Francisco Córdova | 477' |
| 53 | 08-23-1998 | Ricardo Rincón | 393' |
| 54 | 08-26-1998 | Justin Speier | 509' |
| 55 | 08-30-1998 | Dennis Martínez | 501' |
| 56 | 09-01-1998 | Liván Hernández | 450' |
| 57 | 09-01-1998 | Donn Pall | 472' |
| 58 | 09-02-1998 | Brian Edmondson | 497' |
| 59 | 09-02-1998 | Rob Stanifer | 458' |
| 60 | 09-05-1998 | Dennys Reyes | 381' |
| 61 | 09-07-1998 | Mike Morgan | 430' |
| 62 | 09-08-1998 | Steve Trachsel | 341' |
| 63 | 09-15-1998 | Jason Christiansen | 385' |
| 64 | 09-18-1998 | Rafael Roque | 423' |
| 65 | 09-20-1998 | Scott Karl | 423' |
| 66 | 09-25-1998 | Shayne Bennett | 375' |
| 67 | 09-26-1998 | Dustin Hermanson | 403' |
| 68 | 09-26-1998 | Kirk Bullinger | 435' |
| 69 | 09-27-1998 | Mike Thurman | 377' |
| 70 | 09-27-1998 | Carl Pavano | 370' |

== Awards and honors ==
- Mark McGwire, Franchise Record, Most Home Runs in One Season (70)
- Mark McGwire, Major League Baseball Home Run Champion
- Mark McGwire, Major League record, Most home runs through July 31 (45)
- Mark McGwire, First player to hit 50 home runs in three straight seasons: 1996–1998
- Mark McGwire, Associated Press Athlete of the Year
- Mark McGwire, First Base, Silver Slugger Award
- Mark McGwire, Sports Illustrated Sportsman of the Year

All-Star Game

- Mark McGwire, first base, starter

== Farm system ==
| Level | Team | League | Manager |
|---|---|---|---|
| AAA | Memphis Redbirds | Pacific Coast League | Gaylen Pitts |
| AA | Arkansas Travelers | Texas League | Chris Maloney |
| A | Prince William Cannons | Carolina League | Joe Cunningham, Jr. |
| A | Peoria Chiefs | Midwest League | Jeff Shireman |
| A-Short Season | New Jersey Cardinals | New York–Penn League | José Oquendo |
| Rookie | Johnson City Cardinals | Appalachian League | Steve Turco |
