= Lariel González =

Dominican baseball player (born 1976)

- Pitcher
- Born: May 25, 1976 (age 50); San Cristóbal, Dominican Republic
- Batted: Right Threw: Right

MLB debut
- September 22, 1998, for the Colorado Rockies

Last MLB appearance
- September 22, 1998, for the Colorado Rockies

MLB statistics
- Innings pitched: 1
- Earned run average: 0.00
- Stats at Baseball Reference

Teams
- Colorado Rockies (1998)

Lariel Alfonso González (born May 25, 1976) is a Dominican former Major League Baseball pitcher who played for one season.

Before the 1998 season, Baseball America named him the 94th-best prospect in baseball. He pitched in the Colorado Rockies' farm system from 1994 until September 7, 1998 when he was called up to the Rockies' Major League roster along with Jim Stoops, Edgard Clemente, Derrick Gibson and Mark Strittmatter. He made his Major League debut on September 22 against the Arizona Diamondbacks at Coors Field in Denver in relief of Curt Leskanic. He faced three batters, Brent Brede, David Dellucci and Jay Bell and retired them all in order. He was returned to the Minor Leagues in 1999 and, in January 2000, was traded to the New York Mets along with Bobby Jones for Masato Yoshii. He signed a contract with the Mets for the 2000 season for $202,000. González spent the 2000 season in the minors with the Triple-A Norfolk Tides and was designated for assignment in December 2000. He was subsequently picked up by the Chicago Cubs and spent the 2001 season in the minors with the West Tenn Diamond Jaxx. González last played professional baseball in 2002 in the independent Atlantic League with the Camden Riversharks.
