= Jim Stoops =

American baseball player (born 1972)

- Pitcher
- Born: June 30, 1972 (age 54); Edison, New Jersey, U.S.
- Batted: Right Threw: Right

MLB debut
- September 9, 1998, for the Colorado Rockies

Last MLB appearance
- September 26, 1998, for the Colorado Rockies

MLB statistics
- Win–loss record: 1–0
- Earned run average: 2.25
- Strikeouts: 0
- Stats at Baseball Reference

Teams
- Colorado Rockies (1998)

James Wellington Stoops (born June 30, 1972) is an American former professional baseball pitcher who played in Major League Baseball for one season with the Colorado Rockies in three games during the 1998 season.

Stoops attended Franklin High School in the Somerset section of Franklin Township, Somerset County, New Jersey. He did not receive any scholarship offers to play college baseball but was able to walk on to the baseball team at the University of South Carolina. Stoops was never selected in the Major League Baseball draft but signed a minor league contract with the San Francisco Giants; he had impressed a Giants scout by pitching a scoreless relief outing against the top-ranked 1995 Clemson Tigers baseball team.

On July 31, 1998, the Giants traded Stoops to the Rockies along with Darryl Hamilton and a player to be named later in exchange for Ellis Burks. Prior to the trade, he had never played above High-A and was 3.5 years older than his average teammate on the 1999 San Jose Giants. On September 7, 1998, Stoops was added to the Rockies' Major League roster along with Lariel González, Edgard Clemente, Derrick Gibson and Mark Strittmatter. He made his Major League debut on September 9, pitching a scoreless inning in relief of Curt Leskanic against the Florida Marlins at Coors Field. Stoops appeared in just two more games that season and in his Major League career. His only win came on September 11 against his original team, the Giants.

Stoops returned to the minor leagues following the 1998 season. In 2001, he joined the farm system of the New York Yankees. He was out of baseball in 2002 and 2003 before signing with the Long Island Ducks of the independent Atlantic League in May 2004 in a comeback attempt. The 2004 season would be his last as a professional baseball player.
