= 1998 San Francisco Giants season =

1998 San Francisco Giants
- League: National League
- Division: West
- Ballpark: 3Com Park at Candlestick Point
- City: San Francisco, California
- Record: 89–74 (.546)
- Divisional place: 2nd
- Owners: Peter Magowan
- General managers: Brian Sabean
- Managers: Dusty Baker
- Television: KTVU (Mike Krukow, Duane Kuiper, Lon Simmons, Ted Robinson, Jon Miller); Fox Sports Bay Area (Jon Miller, Duane Kuiper)
- Radio: KNBR (Mike Krukow, Duane Kuiper, Lon Simmons, Ted Robinson, Jon Miller ) SP Radio (Erwin Higueros, Rene De La Rosa, Amaury Pi-Gonzalez)

The 1998 San Francisco Giants season was the Giants' 116th season in Major League Baseball, their 41st season in San Francisco since their move from New York following the 1957 season, and their 39th at 3Com Park at Candlestick Point. The team finished in second place in the National League West with an 89–74 record, 9½ games behind the San Diego Padres. They tied the Chicago Cubs for the Wild Card spot and played a tie-breaker game, which the Giants lost 5-3.

== Offseason ==
- November 11, 1997: Chris Singleton and Alberto Castillo were traded by the Giants to the New York Yankees for Charlie Hayes and cash.
- November 21, 1997: Brent Mayne was signed as a free agent by the Giants.
- December 6, 1997: Danny Darwin was signed as a free agent by the Giants.
- January 21, 1998: Alex Diaz was signed as a free agent by the Giants.
- January 29, 1998: Jalal Leach was traded by the Seattle Mariners with Scott Smith (minors) to the San Francisco Giants for David McCarty.

== Regular season ==
=== Opening Day starters ===
- Rich Aurilia
- Barry Bonds
- Shawn Estes
- Darryl Hamilton
- Stan Javier
- John Johnstone
- Jeff Kent
- Bill Mueller
- J. T. Snow

=== Season standings ===
NL West
Team	W	L	Pct.	GB	Home	Road
San Diego Padres	98	64	.605	—	54‍–‍27	44‍–‍37
San Francisco Giants	89	74	.546	9½	49‍–‍32	40‍–‍42
Los Angeles Dodgers	83	79	.512	15	48‍–‍33	35‍–‍46
Colorado Rockies	77	85	.475	21	42‍–‍39	35‍–‍46
Arizona Diamondbacks	65	97	.401	33	34‍–‍47	31‍–‍50

=== Record vs. opponents ===
1998 National League record Source: MLB Standings Grid – 1998
Team	AZ	ATL	CHC	CIN	COL	FLA	HOU	LAD	MIL	MON	NYM	PHI	PIT	SD	SF	STL	AL
Arizona	—	1–8	5–7	4–5	6–6	6–2	4–5	4–8	6–3	2–7	4–5	2–7	6–3	3–9	5–7	2–7	5–8
Atlanta	8–1	—	3–6	7–2	5–3	7–5	4–5	8–1	7–2	6–6	9–3	8–4	7–2	5–4	7–2	6–3	9–7
Chicago	7–5	6–3	—	6–5	7–2	7–2	4–7	4–5	6–6	7–2	4–5	3–6	8–3	5–4	7–3	4–7	5–8
Cincinnati	5–4	2–7	5–6	—	4–5	9–0	3–8	5–4	6–5	8–1	3–6	4–5	5–7	1–11	2–7	8–3	7-6
Colorado	6–6	3–5	2–7	5–4	—	6–3	6–5	6–6	4–7	7–2	3–6	5–4	5–4	5–7	7–5	3–6	4–8
Florida	2–6	5–7	2–7	0–9	3–6	—	3–6	4–5	0–9	5–7	5–7	6–6	3–6	4–5	0–9	4–5	8–8
Houston	5–4	5–4	7–4	8–3	5–6	6–3	—	3–6	9–2	7–2	5–4	7–2	9–2	5–4	6–3	5–7	10–4
Los Angeles	8–4	1–8	5–4	4–5	6–6	5–4	6–3	—	5–4	5–4	3–5	5–4	7–5	5–7	6–6	4–5	8–5
Milwaukee	3–6	2–7	6–6	5–6	7–4	9–0	2–9	4–5	—	6–3	1–8	4–5	6–5	3–6	5–4	3–8	8–6
Montreal	7–2	6–6	2–7	1–8	2–7	7–5	2–7	4–5	3–6	—	8–4	5–7	2–7	4–4	3–6	3–6	6–10
New York	5–4	3–9	5–4	6–3	6–3	7–5	4–5	5–3	8–1	4–8	—	8–4	4–5	4–5	4–5	6–3	9–7
Philadelphia	7-2	4–8	6–3	5–4	4–5	6–6	2–7	4–5	5–4	7–5	4–8	—	8–1	1–8	2–6	3–6	7–9
Pittsburgh	3–6	2–7	3–8	7–5	4–5	6–3	2–9	5–7	5–6	7–2	5–4	1–8	—	5–4	2–7	6–5	6–7
San Diego	9–3	4–5	4–5	11–1	7–5	5–4	4–5	7–5	6–3	4–4	5–4	8–1	4–5	—	8–4	6–3	6–7
San Francisco	7–5	2–7	3–7	7–2	5–7	9–0	3–6	6–6	4–5	6–3	5–4	6–2	7–2	4–8	—	7–5	8–5
St. Louis	7–2	3–6	7–4	3–8	6–3	5-4	7–5	5–4	8–3	6–3	3–6	6–3	5–6	3–6	5–7	—	4–9

=== Notable transactions ===
- April 6, 1998: Jalal Leach was released by the San Francisco Giants.
- May 11, 1998: Jalal Leach was signed as a free agent with the San Francisco Giants.
- June 2, 1998: Cody Ransom was drafted by the Giants in the 9th round of the 1998 Major League Baseball draft. Player signed June 4, 1998.
- July 23, 1998: Joe Carter was traded by the Baltimore Orioles to the San Francisco Giants for Darin Blood (minors).
- September 14, 1998: Alex Diaz was released by the Giants.

=== Roster ===
1998 San Francisco Giants
Roster
Pitchers: 41 Cory Bailey; 51 Chris Brock; 43 Danny Darwin; 55 Shawn Estes; 26 Mark Gardner; 45 Dean Hartgraves; 53 Orel Hershiser; 49 John Johnstone; 47 José Mesa; 52 Alvin Morman; 31 Robb Nen; 48 Russ Ortiz; 19 Jim Poole; 39 Steve Reed; 33 Rich Rodriguez; 46 Kirk Rueter; 52 Julián Tavárez	Catchers: 18 Brian Johnson; 9 Brent Mayne; 19 Doug Mirabelli; Infielders: 35 Rich Aurilia; 47 Jeff Ball; 62 Wilson Delgado; 8 Shawon Dunston; 13 Charlie Hayes; 21 Jeff Kent; 34 Ramón Martínez; 32 Bill Mueller; 14 Rey Sánchez; 6 J. T. Snow	Outfielders: 7 Marvin Benard; 25 Barry Bonds; 23 Ellis Burks; 29 Joe Carter; 1 Alex Diaz; 5 Darryl Hamilton; 28 Stan Javier; 2 Chris Jones; 30 Dante Powell; 1 Armando Ríos; Other batters: 30 Jacob Cruz	Manager: 12 Dusty Baker; Coaches: 17 Carlos Alfonso (first base); 20 Gene Clines (hitting); 15 Sonny Jackson (bench); 59 Juan Lopez (bullpen); 16 Ron Perranoski (pitching); 10 Ron Wotus (third base)

== Player stats ==
=== Batting ===
==== Starters by position ====
Note: Pos = Position; G = Games played; AB = At bats; H = Hits; Avg. = Batting average; HR = Home runs; RBI = Runs batted in

Pos	Player	G	AB	H	Avg.	HR	RBI
C	Brian Johnson	99	308	73	.237	13	34
1B	J.T. Snow	138	435	108	.248	15	79
2B	Jeff Kent	137	526	156	.297	31	128
SS	Rich Aurilia	122	413	110	.266	9	49
3B	Bill Mueller	145	534	157	.294	9	59
LF	Barry Bonds	156	552	167	.303	37	122
CF	Darryl Hamilton	97	367	108	.294	1	26
RF	Stan Javier	135	417	121	.290	4	49

==== Other batters ====
Note: G = Games played; AB = At bats; H = Hits; Avg. = Batting average; HR = Home runs; RBI = Runs batted in

Player	G	AB	H	Avg.	HR	RBI
Charlie Hayes	111	329	94	.286	12	62
Rey Sánchez	109	316	90	.285	2	30
Marvin Benard	121	286	92	.322	3	36
Brent Mayne	94	275	75	.273	3	32
Ellis Burks	42	147	45	.306	5	22
Joe Carter	41	105	31	.295	7	29
Chris Jones	43	90	17	.189	2	10
Alex Diaz	34	62	8	.129	0	5
Shawon Dunston	36	51	9	.176	3	8
Ramón Martínez	19	19	6	.316	0	0
Doug Mirabelli	10	17	4	.235	1	4
Wilson Delgado	10	12	2	.167	0	1
Armando Ríos	12	7	4	.571	2	3
Dante Powell	8	4	2	.500	1	1
Jeff Ball	2	4	1	.250	0	0
Jacob Cruz	3	3	0	.000	0	0

=== Pitching ===
==== Starting pitchers ====
Note: G = Games pitched; IP = Innings pitched; W = Wins; L = Losses; ERA = Earned run average; SO = Strikeouts

Player	G	IP	W	L	ERA	SO
Mark Gardner	33	212.0	13	6	4.33	151
Orel Hershiser	34	202.0	11	10	4.41	126
Kirk Reuter	33	187.2	16	9	4.36	102
Shawn Estes	25	149.1	7	12	5.06	136
Danny Darwin	33	148.2	8	10	5.51	81

==== Other pitchers ====
Note: G = Games pitched; IP = Innings pitched; W = Wins; L = Losses; ERA = Earned run average; SO = Strikeouts

Player	G	IP	W	L	ERA	SO
Russ Ortiz	22	88.1	4	4	4.99	75

==== Relief pitchers ====
Note: G = Games pitched; W = Wins; L = Losses; SV = Saves; ERA = Earned run average; SO = Strikeouts

Player	G	W	L	SV	ERA	SO
Robb Nen	78	7	7	40	1.52	110
John Johnstone	70	6	5	0	3.07	86
Rich Rodriguez	68	4	0	2	3.70	44
Julián Tavárez	60	5	3	1	3.80	52
Steve Reed	50	2	1	1	1.48	50
Jose Mesa	32	5	3	0	3.52	28
Jim Poole	26	1	3	0	5.29	16
Chris Brock	13	0	0	0	3.90	19
Alvin Morman	9	0	1	0	5.14	7
Dean Hartgraves	5	0	0	0	9.53	4
Cory Bailey	5	0	0	0	2.70	2

== Award winners ==
- 1998 Jeff Kent 2B, Willie Mac Award

All-Star Game

== Farm system ==
Level	Team	League	Manager
AAA	Fresno Grizzlies	Pacific Coast League	Jim Davenport
AA	Shreveport Captains	Texas League	Mike Hart
A	Bakersfield Blaze	California League	Frank Reberger
A	San Jose Giants	California League	Shane Turner
A-Short Season	Salem-Keizer Volcanoes	Northwest League	Keith Comstock

LEAGUE CHAMPIONS: San Jose, Salem-Keizer
