= Mike Saipe =

American baseball player (born 1973)

- Pitcher
- Born: September 10, 1973 (age 53); San Diego, California, U.S.
- Batted: Right Threw: Right

MLB debut
- June 25, 1998, for the Colorado Rockies

Last MLB appearance
- July 1, 1998, for the Colorado Rockies

MLB statistics
- Win–loss record: 0–1
- Earned run average: 10.80
- Strikeouts: 2
- Stats at Baseball Reference

Teams
- Colorado Rockies (1998)

Michael Eric Saipe (born September 10, 1973) is an American former professional baseball player. Saipe played for the Colorado Rockies of Major League Baseball (MLB) in the 1998 season. In two games, Saipe had a 0–1 record with a 10.80 ERA.

== Career ==
He batted and threw right-handed.

Saipe was born in San Diego, California, and is Jewish. He attended University City High School in San Diego, and the University of California, San Diego in La Jolla, California. Saipe also attended the University of San Diego, where he played college baseball for the Toreros from 1992 to 1994. In 1992 and 1993, he played collegiate summer baseball with the Cotuit Kettleers of the Cape Cod Baseball League and was named a league all-star in 1993. He was drafted by the Rockies in the 12th round of the 1994 Major League Baseball draft.
