= Jeff Ball (baseball) =

American baseball player (born 1969)

- First baseman
- Born: April 17, 1969 (age 57); Merced, California, U.S.
- Batted: Right Threw: Right

Professional debut
- MLB: June 10, 1998, for the San Francisco Giants
- NPB: March 31, 2000, for the Hiroshima Toyo Carp

Last appearance
- MLB: June 16, 1998, for the San Francisco Giants
- NPB: April 4, 2000, for the Hiroshima Toyo Carp

MLB statistics
- Batting average: .250
- Home runs: 0
- Runs batted in: 1

NPB statistics
- Batting average: .250
- Home runs: 0
- Runs batted in: 0
- Stats at Baseball Reference

Teams
- San Francisco Giants (1998); Hiroshima Toyo Carp (2000)

Jeffery D. Ball (born April 17, 1969) is the Assistant Coach of the Atlantic Cape Community College baseball team. He is the former assistant general manager of the Atlantic City Surf professional baseball team, Ball took the position on March 21, 2007 after being the team's field manager for the previous three seasons.

Ball is a former major league first baseman who played in two games for the San Francisco Giants in 1998, getting 1 hit in 4 at-bats. He also played with the Hiroshima Toyo Carp in 2000.

He was enrolled in the San Jose State University.
