= Rafael Roque =

Dominican baseball player (born 1972)

- Pitcher
- Born: January 1, 1972 (age 54); Cotuí, Dominican Republic
- Batted: Left Threw: Left

MLB debut
- August 1, 1998, for the Milwaukee Brewers

Last MLB appearance
- September 28, 2000, for the Milwaukee Brewers

MLB statistics
- Win–loss record: 5–8
- Earned run average: 5.36
- Strikeouts: 104
- Stats at Baseball Reference

Teams
- Milwaukee Brewers (1998–2000)

Rafael Antonio Roque (born January 1, 1972) is a Dominican former baseball player and coach who pitched for three seasons, from 1998 to 2000, with the Milwaukee Brewers. Roque later was a pitching coach in the Dominican Summer League.

== Playing career ==
=== Minor leagues ===
Roque began his professional baseball career in 1991 when he signed with the New York Mets minor league system. He did not pitch in the minor leagues until the following season, and spent six seasons in the Mets organization, winning no more than 6 games in a single season. After becoming a minor league free agent, Roque signed with the Brewers organization for the 1998 season. In his first year with the Brewers, he combined to win 10 games with the AA El Paso Diablos and the AAA Louisville Redbirds, recording a 5–2 record at Louisville.

=== Major League Baseball ===
Roque was called up to the major leagues late in the 1998 season, and made his debut as a starter on August 1 against the Arizona Diamondbacks, earning a no-decision in his first start. Over the course of the season, Roque had a 4–2 record with a 4.88 earned run average. Coincidentally, during his first Major League season, Roque gave up both Mark McGwire and Sammy Sosa's 64th home runs.

Roque was named the Brewers' Opening Day starter for the 1999 season. He did not earn a win in any of his first 8 starts, and pitched out of the bullpen for much of the remainder of the season. On July 5, 1999, Roque picked up the one and only save of his MLB career in impressive fashion. Roque pitched the final three innings of a 5-0 Brewers win over the Phillies. He allowed 3 hits and zero runs, striking out four hitters. He saved the game for starting pitcher Jim Abbott.

Roque spent much of the 2000 season in the minor leagues but did appear in four games with the Brewers over the course of the season. These were his last Major League appearances. His major league career ended with a 5–8 record and a 5.36 ERA.

Roque spent 2001 in the Boston Red Sox organization. He then played for the Tigres de México of the Mexican League in 2002–03. After one last brief comeback in Mexico in 2005, his professional career was over.

== Coaching career ==
Roque was the pitching coach in the Dominican Summer League (DSL) for the DSL Royals from 2007 to 2014. He joined the DSL Mets in 2016. He was named as the pitching coach for the DSL Mets 2 for the 2018 season. He returned to the DSL Mets 2 in 2019. He did not return to the Mets organization in 2021.

Roque also coached the Dominican Republic national team in the 2015 WBSC Premier12.

== Personal life ==
Roque and his wife have two children. He also has two older children.
