= Derrick Gibson (baseball) =

American baseball player (born 1975)

- Outfielder
- Born: February 5, 1975 (age 51); Winter Haven, Florida, U.S.
- Batted: Right Threw: Right

MLB debut
- September 8, 1998, for the Colorado Rockies

Last MLB appearance
- September 26, 1999, for the Colorado Rockies

MLB statistics
- Batting average: .286
- Hits: 14
- Home runs: 2
- Stats at Baseball Reference

Teams
- Colorado Rockies (1998–1999)

Derrick Lamont Gibson (born February 5, 1975) is an American former professional baseball outfielder who played for two seasons. He played for the Colorado Rockies of the Major League Baseball (MLB) for seven games in left field during the 1998 Colorado Rockies season and ten games in right field during the 1999 Colorado Rockies season.
