= Luis Ordaz =

Venezuelan baseball player (born 1975)

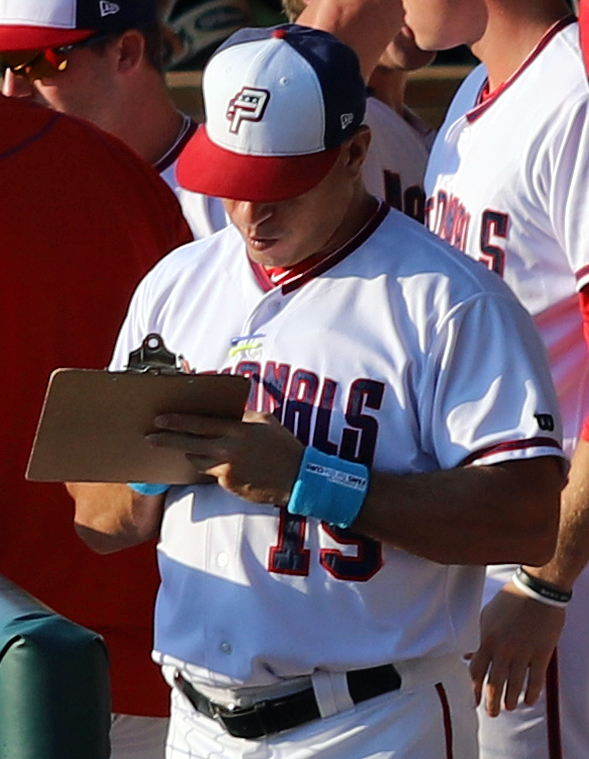
- Ordaz with the Potomac Nationals in 2018
- Infielder
- Born: August 12, 1975 (age 51); Maracaibo, Venezuela
- Batted: Right Threw: Right

MLB debut
- September 3, 1997, for the St. Louis Cardinals

Last MLB appearance
- April 3, 2006, for the Tampa Bay Devil Rays

MLB statistics
- Batting average: .218
- Hits: 96
- Runs scored: 51
- Stats at Baseball Reference

Teams
- St. Louis Cardinals (1997–1999); Kansas City Royals (2000–2002); Tampa Bay Devil Rays (2006)

Luis Javier Ordaz (born August 12, 1975) is a Venezuelan former Major League Baseball (MLB) utility infielder and coach. Ordaz played for the St. Louis Cardinals (1997–1999), Kansas City Royals (2000–2002) and Tampa Bay Devil Rays (2006). He bats and throws right-handed.

== Career ==
In a six-season career, Ordaz posted a .219 hitter with 30 runs batted in and no home runs in 205 games played.

In 2013, Ordaz, was the hitting coach for the Class-A Auburn Doubledays. In 2014, Ordaz became the hitting coach for the South Atlantic League Hagerstown Suns. In the 2018 season, he was the hitting coach for the Potomac Nationals (Class A - Advanced).

== See also ==
- List of Major League Baseball players from Venezuela
