= Mark Brownson =

American baseball player (1975-2017)

- Pitcher
- Born: June 17, 1975; Lake Worth Beach, Florida, U.S.
- Died: February 1, 2017 (aged 41); Wellington, Florida, U.S.
- Batted: Left Threw: Right

MLB debut
- July 21, 1998, for the Colorado Rockies

Last MLB appearance
- July 20, 2000, for the Philadelphia Phillies

MLB statistics
- Win–loss record: 2–2
- Earned run average: 6.94
- Strikeouts: 32
- Stats at Baseball Reference

Teams
- Colorado Rockies (1998–1999); Philadelphia Phillies (2000)

Marshall Phillip "Mark" Brownson III (June 17, 1975 – February 1, 2017) was an American professional baseball right-handed pitcher, who played in Major League Baseball (MLB) for the Colorado Rockies (1998–1999) and Philadelphia Phillies (2000).

== Career ==
Brownson was drafted by the Colorado Rockies in the 30th round (856th overall) of the 1993 Major League Baseball draft, out of Wellington High School. He spent one semester at Palm Beach State College.

Brownson made his big league debut on July 21, 1998, hurling a 4-hit, complete game shutout, against the Houston Astros. As of 2020, his game score of 85 is the highest by any National League debutant pitcher in the Wild Card Era. Unfortunately, he struggled throughout the remainder of his short MLB career, compiling an 8.54 earned run average (ERA) in the 10 games after his magical debut. Brownson pitched in his 11th and final major league game on July 20, 2000, just a short time after his 25th birthday.

Brownson had pitched through a torn labrum during the 2000 season and required surgery after the season, from which he never fully recovered.

== Personal and death ==
Mark Brownson was born in Lake Worth Beach, Florida. He was married with two daughters, Madisyn and Aliah. According to his wife, he struggled to adjust to life after baseball. Brownson developed a dependence on painkillers related to nagging arm injuries which eventually developed into a heroin problem. The couple divorced in 2012, after which Brownson spent time homeless in Florida.

After Brownson retired from baseball, he and his wife opened a pool cleaning business in Florida, before relocating the business to Arizona.

Brownson died on February 1, 2017, aged 41. He was predeceased by his brother Travis and survived by his mother Ginny Brownson and father Jack Brownson.
