= Alvin Morman =

American baseball player (born 1969)

- Pitcher
- Born: January 6, 1969 (age 57); Rockingham, North Carolina, U.S.
- Batted: Left Threw: Left

MLB debut
- April 2, 1996, for the Houston Astros

Last MLB appearance
- October 2, 1999, for the Kansas City Royals

MLB statistics
- Win–loss record: 6–7
- Earned run average: 4.79
- Strikeouts: 98
- Stats at Baseball Reference

Teams
- Houston Astros (1996); Cleveland Indians (1997–1998); San Francisco Giants (1998); Kansas City Royals (1999)

Alvin Morman (born January 6, 1969) is an American former Major League Baseball player. A pitcher, Morman played for the Houston Astros in 1996, Cleveland Indians in 1997 and 1998, San Francisco Giants also in 1998, and Kansas City Royals in 1999. Now retired, Morman works as a student counselor at Fuquay-Varina Middle School in Fuquay-Varina, North Carolina.
