= Bobby Jones (left-handed pitcher) =

American baseball player (born 1972)

- Pitcher
- Born: April 11, 1972 (age 54); Orange, New Jersey, U.S.
- Batted: Right Threw: Left

MLB debut
- May 18, 1997, for the Colorado Rockies

Last MLB appearance
- April 11, 2004, for the Boston Red Sox

MLB statistics
- Win–loss record: 14–21
- Earned run average: 5.77
- Strikeouts: 229
- Stats at Baseball Reference

Teams
- Colorado Rockies (1997–1999); New York Mets (2000, 2002); San Diego Padres (2002); Boston Red Sox (2004)

Robert Mitchell Jones (born April 11, 1972) is an American former professional baseball pitcher. He played in Major League Baseball (MLB) during six seasons between 1997 and 2004. He made his MLB debut on May 18, 1997, for the Colorado Rockies.

== Playing career ==
=== Minor leagues ===
Jones moved to Rutherford, New Jersey in 1981 and played in Rutherford Little League from 1982 to 1984. In 1991, he was drafted by the Milwaukee Brewers in the 44th round as a draft-and-follow. He signed prior to the 1992 draft and was assigned to Helena in the Pioneer League (rookie), where he went 5–4.

Jones rose through the Brewers' organization, playing at Beloit (Midwest League, Low A) in 1993 and Stockton (California League, High A) in 1994. Following the 1994 season, the Colorado Rockies chose Jones in the minor league phase of the Rule 5 draft.

In 1995, Jones spent most of the season with the New Haven Ravens (Eastern League, Double-A), who lost the league championship series to Reading. Around the All-Star break, he spent a month with the Colorado Springs Sky Sox (Pacific Coast League, Triple-A). He was back with the Sky Sox in 1996 and 1997, and he was 5–1 when the Rockies called him up to replace the injured Bill Swift on the roster.

=== Major league career ===
Jones made his major league debut at Shea Stadium against his boyhood team, the New York Mets. He got a no-decision in that game, won by the Mets, but earned the victory in his next start, against the Houston Astros.

Jones spent all of 1998 and most of 1999 with the Colorado club, splitting his time between the starting rotation and the bullpen. In early 2000, the Rockies traded Jones to the Mets, making him teammates with right handed pitcher Bobby J. Jones. The two had faced each other in a 1999 game, with the Rockies' pitcher earning the victory.

The lefthanded Jones spent the 2001 season on the disabled list, but came back to the Mets in 2002 before being traded to the San Diego Padres, coincidentally becoming reunited there with Bobby J. Jones. He spent 2003 in Triple-A, starting with the Richmond Braves and finishing with the Omaha Royals. He was a non-roster invitee in 2004 Boston Red Sox spring training and made the big club from there, but then went into rehabilitation. After a brief stint with the independent Newark Bears of the Atlantic League in 2005, the Chicago White Sox picked him up and assigned him to Triple-A Charlotte. In 2006, Jones was signed by the Detroit Tigers, pitching for Double-A Erie.

== Coaching career ==
From 2016 to 2022, Jones served as manager for the Sussex County Miners of the Frontier League. He then became the Vice President and Chief Baseball Officer for the New Jersey Jackals of the Frontier League and the pitching coach for the Trenton Thunder of the MLB Draft League. Jones operated his own baseball academy named Bobby Jones Sports in Montville, New Jersey, until it was closed down. Jones also spent time as the pitching coach for both the Don Bosco Prep and Montclair Mounties varsity baseball teams. He also worked with the Academy of Pro Players located in Hawthorne, New Jersey, as a pitching instructor. Jones returned to the Jackals in 2026 as the manager.
