= Mark Strittmatter =

American baseball player & coach (born 1969)

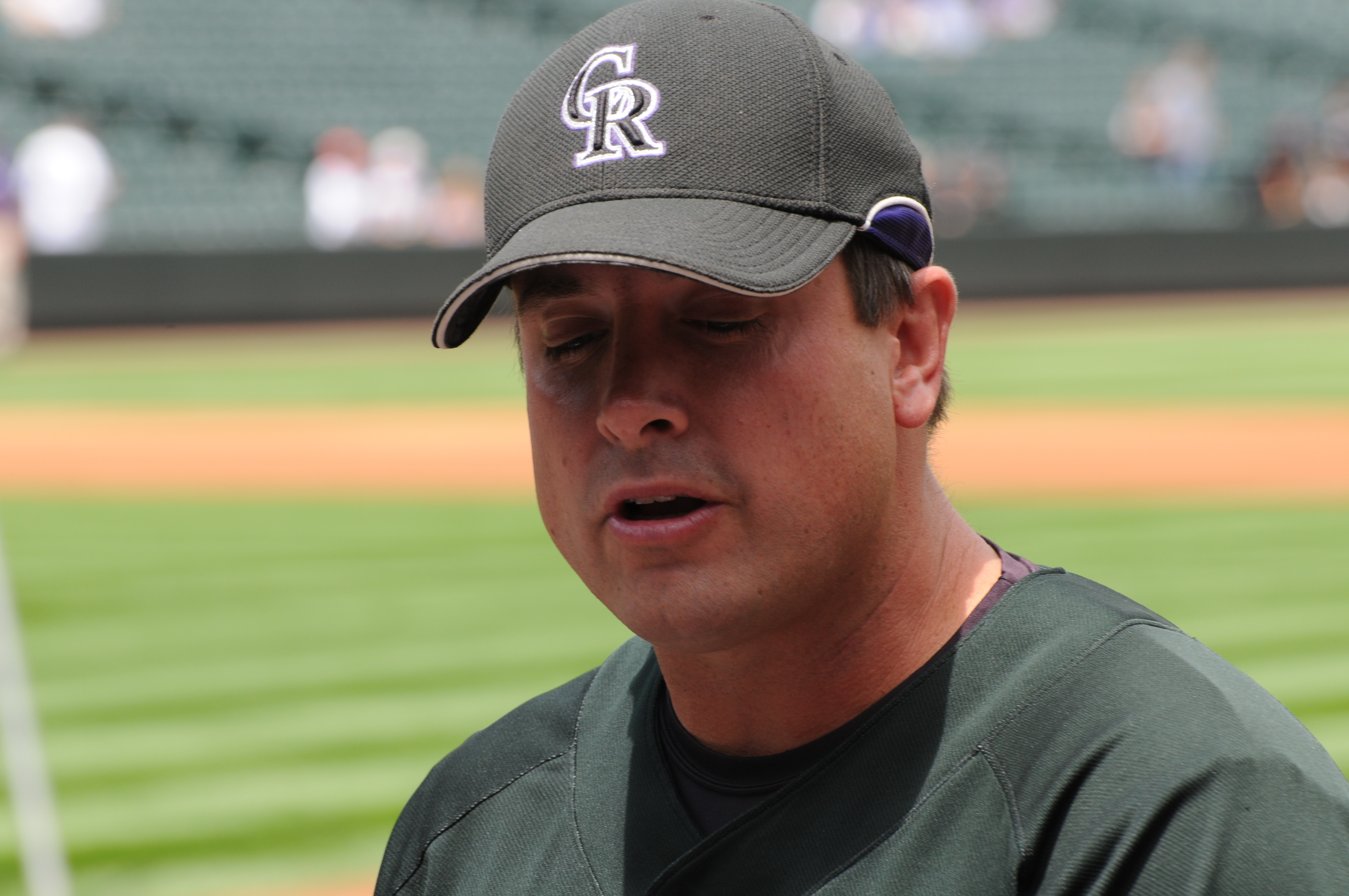
- Strittmatter with the Colorado Rockies

Chicago Cubs – No. 81
- Catcher / Coach
- Born: April 4, 1969 (age 57); Huntington, New York, U.S.
- Batted: Right Threw: Right

MLB debut
- September 3, 1998, for the Colorado Rockies

Last MLB appearance
- September 25, 1998, for the Colorado Rockies

MLB statistics
- Batting average: .000
- Home runs: 0
- Runs batted in: 0
- Stats at Baseball Reference

Teams
- As player: Colorado Rockies (1998); As coach: Chicago Cubs (2024–present)

Mark Arthur Strittmatter (born April 4, 1969) is an American professional baseball catcher and coach who currently serves as the bullpen coach for the Chicago Cubs of Major League Baseball (MLB). He played in MLB for the Colorado Rockies for one season in 1998.

== College ==
Strittmatter played college baseball at the County College of Morris in Randolph, New Jersey, for two years before transferring to Virginia Commonwealth University (VCU), where he helped lead the VCU Rams to the Metro Conference championship in 1992.

== Playing career ==
The Colorado Rockies selected Strittmatter in the 1992 MLB draft. He made his professional debut that year with the Bend Rockies. Strittmatter spent most of his playing career in the minor leagues (1992–2000).

The Rockies promoted Strittmatter to the major leagues to make his debut on September 3, 1998, when Jeff Reed was injured. He was in the major leagues for 27 days and went hitless in four total at bats in four games.

In August 2000, the Rockies traded Strittmatter to the San Diego Padres for a player to be named later. He played for the Padres organization in 2000 before retiring.

== Coaching career ==
Strittmatter served as the Rockies' bullpen catcher from 2003 to 2010. He joined the Pittsburgh Pirates as a coach in 2011.

The Chicago Cubs hired Strittmatter as their catching coach before the 2024 season. On December 13, 2024, Strittmatter was named the bullpen coach for Chicago.

== Personal life ==
Strittmatter and his wife, Katie, have two children, son Sean and daughter Emily. Katie has Parkinson's disease. He helps out with youth baseball players as a part of his foundation for youth.
