= Curtis King (baseball) =

American baseball player (born 1970)

- Pitcher
- Born: October 25, 1970 (age 55); Norristown, Pennsylvania, U.S.
- Batted: Right Threw: Right

MLB debut
- August 1, 1997, for the St. Louis Cardinals

Last MLB appearance
- June 20, 1999, for the St. Louis Cardinals

MLB statistics
- Win–loss record: 6–2
- Earned run average: 3.43
- Strikeouts: 42
- Stats at Baseball Reference

Teams
- St. Louis Cardinals (1997–1999)

Curtis Albert King (born October 25, 1970) is an American former pitcher in Major League Baseball. He played for the St. Louis Cardinals.
