= Mike Busby =

American baseball player (born 1972)

- Pitcher
- Born: December 27, 1972 (age 53); Lomita, California, U.S.
- Batted: Right Threw: Right

MLB debut
- April 7, 1996, for the St. Louis Cardinals

Last MLB appearance
- July 8, 1999, for the St. Louis Cardinals

MLB statistics
- Win–loss record: 5–6
- Earned run average: 6.48
- Strikeouts: 50
- Stats at Baseball Reference

Teams
- St. Louis Cardinals (1996–1999)

Michael James Busby (born December 27, 1972) is an American former professional baseball pitcher, who played in Major League Baseball (MLB) for the St. Louis Cardinals.
