= Edgard Clemente =

Puerto Rican baseball player (born 1975)

- Outfielder
- Born: December 15, 1975 (age 50); Santurce, San Juan, Puerto Rico
- Batted: Right Threw: Right

MLB debut
- September 10, 1998, for the Colorado Rockies

Last MLB appearance
- July 31, 2000, for the Anaheim Angels

MLB statistics
- Batting average: .249
- Hits: 64
- Home runs: 8
- Runs batted in: 32
- Stats at Baseball Reference

Teams
- Colorado Rockies (1998–1999); Anaheim Angels (2000)

Edgard Alexis Velazquez Clemente (born December 15, 1975) is a Puerto Rican former professional baseball outfielder. He is the nephew of Hall of Famer Roberto Clemente.

== Career ==
Clemente was drafted by the Colorado Rockies in the 10th round of the 1993 Major League Baseball draft as "Edgard Velazquez" (sometimes spelled "Velasquez") and was known by that name until just prior to the 1998 season. He was ranked #71 in Baseball America's top 100 prospects for 1997. Clemente made his Major League Baseball debut with the Rockies on September 10, 1998, and most recently played for the Anaheim Angels on July 31, 2000. In 2006, Clemente played for the Somerset Patriots of the Atlantic League of Professional Baseball. In 2010, he played for the Broncos de Reynosa in the Mexican League, batting .364 in 21 games.

He has two daughters, Nicholle and Valeria.

== See also ==
- List of Major League Baseball players from Puerto Rico
