= Ellis Burks =

American baseball player (born 1964)

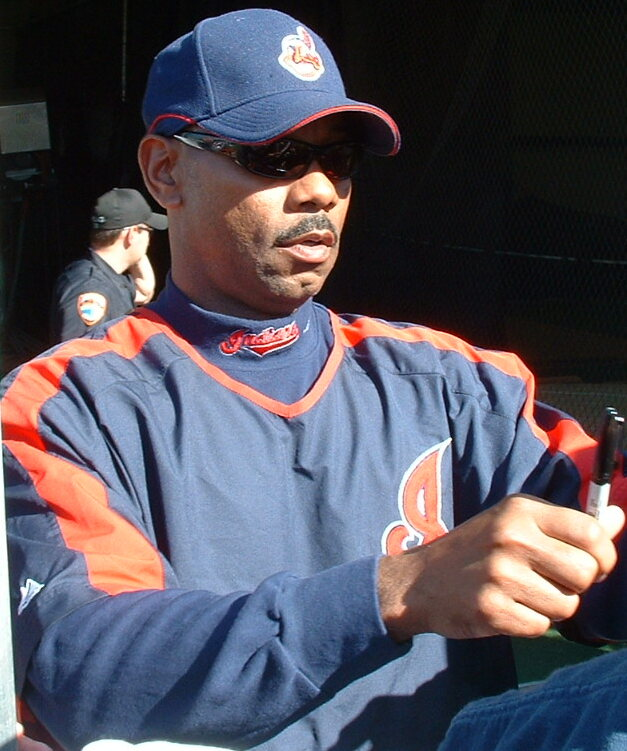
- Burks in 2007
- Outfielder
- Born: September 11, 1964 (age 61); Vicksburg, Mississippi, U.S.
- Batted: Right Threw: Right

MLB debut
- April 30, 1987, for the Boston Red Sox

Last MLB appearance
- October 2, 2004, for the Boston Red Sox

MLB statistics
- Batting average: .291
- Hits: 2,107
- Home runs: 352
- Runs batted in: 1,206
- Stats at Baseball Reference

Teams
- Boston Red Sox (1987–1992); Chicago White Sox (1993); Colorado Rockies (1994–1998); San Francisco Giants (1998–2000); Cleveland Indians (2001–2003); Boston Red Sox (2004)

Career highlights and awards
- 2× All-Star (1990, 1996); Gold Glove Award (1990); 2× Silver Slugger Award (1990, 1996); Boston Red Sox Hall of Fame

Ellis Rena Burks (born September 11, 1964) is an American former outfielder. Burks played in Major League Baseball (MLB) for 18 seasons from 1987 to 2004 with the Boston Red Sox, Chicago White Sox, Colorado Rockies, San Francisco Giants, and Cleveland Indians. Burks was a two-time MLB All-Star, two-time Silver Slugger Award winner, a Gold Glove Award winner, and a member of the 30–30 club. He is a member of the Boston Red Sox Hall of Fame.

== Early life ==
Burks was born in Vicksburg, Mississippi, but raised in Fort Worth, Texas, and attended Everman High School. Burks was initially overlooked by scouts and only received a scholarship offer from Ranger Junior College after a showcase at Arlington Stadium. His school lost a junior college championship to the Jay Buhner-led McLennan Community College.

== Career ==
Selected by the Boston Red Sox in the first round (20th pick) of the 1983 Major League Baseball draft, Burks made his debut in the 1987 season as a regular center fielder at age 22, becoming the third player in Red Sox history to hit 20 home runs and steal 20 bases in one season. He was selected to both the Baseball Digest and Topps "All-Rookie" teams. Defensively, Burks showed excellent range, a sure glove and a strong arm. Burks, however, was injury-prone. He had shoulder surgery in 1989, and it was the first of many setbacks for him. During the 1990 season he hit two home runs in the same inning of a game, to become the second player in Red Sox history to achieve the feat; Bill Regan was the first, in 1928.

Later, Burks suffered from bad knees and back spasms. After six seasons in Boston, and despite his injuries, he ended up leaving as a free agent and signing with the Chicago White Sox in January 1993. He surpassed expectations around him by turning in a solid, injury-free season, filling the White Sox' urgent need for a quality right fielder. He was one of the club's better performers in the playoffs, batting .304. A free agent at the end of the season, he signed a five-year contract with the Colorado Rockies (1994–98). On April 17, 1994, Burks hit a game-winning home run in the bottom of the 10th inning against the Montreal Expos. It was the only major league walk-off home run ever hit at Mile High Stadium. His 1,000th career hit also came against the Expos, a triple in July 1995.

In 1996, Burks enjoyed his best season. He led National League hitters in runs (142), slugging average (.639), total bases (392) and extra-base hits (93); was second in hits (211) and doubles (45), and fifth in home runs (40) and RBI (128). His .344 average was also second in the race for the batting title (behind Tony Gwynn, .353). Burks finished third in the MVP voting. He also stole 32 bases that season, marking only the second time that two players from the same team collected at least 30 home runs and 30 steals, as Colorado outfielder Dante Bichette accomplished the feat. Burks remains in the top ten in many offensive categories for the Rockies.

While with the Rockies, Burks was part of the Blake Street Bombers that included Andrés Galarraga, Bichette, Larry Walker and Vinny Castilla. This was the heart of the Rockies' lineup that was second in the National League in home runs by team in 1994, then led the National League in home runs from 1995 to 1997.

Burks was traded to the San Francisco Giants in mid-season 1998 for Darryl Hamilton and Jim Stoops. In 2000, batting fifth behind Barry Bonds and Jeff Kent, he compiled numbers of .344, 24, 96, in only 122 games and 393 at bats. He won the 2000 Willie Mac Award for his spirit and leadership.

Burks was signed by the Cleveland Indians after the season. In his new role as a DH for the Indians, Burks provided consistent production in the middle-of-the-lineup, hitting .280, 28, 74 in 2001, and .301, 32, 91 in 2002. He sprained his wrist in spring training of 2003 and kept playing in 55 games until the muscles in his right hand affected his ability to swing the bat. Burks underwent season-ending surgery to repair nerve damage in his right elbow. The Indians did not pick up their 2004 contract option or offer him salary arbitration, and he returned to the Red Sox in 2004, playing eleven games without making the postseason roster. He retired at the end of the season with a World Series ring with the team that he began his career with.

In an 18-year career, Burks was a .291 hitter with 352 home runs, 1,206 runs batted in (RBI), 1,253 runs, 2,107 hits, 402 doubles, 63 triples, 181 stolen bases and 793 walks in 2,000 games. Defensively, Burks recorded a .983 fielding percentage playing at all three outfield positions.

== Post-playing career ==
After the 2005 season, Burks joined the Indians' front office staff as a special assistant to the general manager.

In 2021, Burks joined NESN as a studio analyst and alternate color commentator for Red Sox games.

== Personal life ==
Burks resides in Chagrin Falls, Ohio, and his son, Chris, played baseball in the San Francisco Giants organization. He also has three daughters, Carissa, Elisha, and Breanna. He met his wife, Dori, in Connecticut in 1985.

He is a cousin of fellow Major League outfielder Roosevelt Brown.

== See also ==
- List of Major League Baseball career home run leaders
- List of Major League Baseball career hits leaders
- List of athletes on Wheaties boxes
- List of Major League Baseball career doubles leaders
- List of Major League Baseball career runs scored leaders
- List of Major League Baseball career runs batted in leaders
- 30–30 club
- List of Major League Baseball annual runs scored leaders
- List of Major League Baseball career stolen bases leaders

Preceded by Andrés Galarraga	National League Player of the Month; April 1994	Succeeded by Lenny Dykstra & Mike Piazza
