= 1998 Major League Baseball season =

1998 MLB season
- League: Major League Baseball
- Sport: Baseball
- Duration: March 31 – October 21, 1998
- Games: 162
- Teams: 30
- TV partner(s): Fox/FSN; ESPN; NBC

Draft
- Top draft pick: Pat Burrell
- Picked by: Philadelphia Phillies

Regular season
- Season MVP: AL: Juan González (TEX); NL: Sammy Sosa (CHC)

Postseason
- AL champions: New York Yankees
- AL runners-up: Cleveland Indians
- NL champions: San Diego Padres
- NL runners-up: Atlanta Braves

World Series
- Champions: New York Yankees
- Runners-up: San Diego Padres
- World Series MVP: Scott Brosius (NYY)

MLB seasons
- ← 1997 1999 →

Locations of teams for the 1998 American League season
West Central East
Locations of teams for the 1998–1999 National League seasons
West Central East

The 1998 Major League Baseball season ended with the New York Yankees sweeping the San Diego Padres in the World Series, after they had won a then AL record 114 regular season games. The Yankees finished with 125 wins for the season (regular season and playoffs combined), which remains the MLB record.

The 1998 season was marked by MLB's expansion to 30 teams (16 in the NL, 14 in the AL), with two new teams–the Arizona Diamondbacks in the National League, and the Tampa Bay Devil Rays in the American League–added. To keep the leagues with even numbers of teams while allowing both leagues to have a new team, the Milwaukee Brewers were moved from the American League Central Division to the National League Central Division. The Detroit Tigers were shifted from the American League East to the American League Central, while the Devil Rays were added to the American League East. The Diamondbacks were added to the National League West, making the NL have more teams than the AL for the first time (this arrangement would last until the end of the 2012 season, when the Houston Astros moved from the National to the American League for 2013, giving each league 15 teams).

The biggest story of the season was the historic chase of the single-season home run record held at the time by Roger Maris. Initially, the St. Louis Cardinals' Mark McGwire and Ken Griffey Jr. of the Seattle Mariners started the season on a pace to both break Maris' record. In June, the chase was joined by the Chicago Cubs' Sammy Sosa, who broke the decades-old record of Rudy York for most home runs in a calendar month with 20 that month. Eventually, Griffey fell off the record pace, but still ended with 56 homers. Both McGwire and Sosa broke the record in September, with McGwire ultimately finishing with 70 homers to Sosa's 66. McGwire's record would last only three years, with Barry Bonds hitting 73 in 2001. The 1998 season was also the first in MLB history with four players hitting 50 or more homers, with Greg Vaughn of the San Diego Padres hitting 50. In a postscript to the record chase, both McGwire and Sosa have since been widely accused of having used performance-enhancing drugs during that period, and McGwire would admit in 2010 that he had used steroids during the record-setting season.

The defending World Series champions Florida Marlins finished last in the NL East Division at 54–108, making it the first, and only, time that a team went from winning the World Series one year to finishing with 100 or more losses and last in their division the following year.

== New commissioner ==
On July 9, 1998, Major League Baseball Executive Council chairman Bud Selig officially became the 9th commissioner of baseball, though he had been the de facto commissioner for nearly 6 years. During that time, the owners had tried to find a replacement for previous commissioner Fay Vincent who was forced to step down by the owners towards the end of 1992 season mainly due to the lockout he intervened in during the 1990 season.

== Standings ==
=== American League ===
AL East
Team	W	L	Pct.	GB	Home	Road
^{(1)} New York Yankees	114	48	.704	—	62‍–‍19	52‍–‍29
^{(4)} Boston Red Sox	92	70	.568	22	51‍–‍30	41‍–‍40
Toronto Blue Jays	88	74	.543	26	51‍–‍30	37‍–‍44
Baltimore Orioles	79	83	.488	35	42‍–‍39	37‍–‍44
Tampa Bay Devil Rays	63	99	.389	51	33‍–‍48	30‍–‍51

AL Central
Team	W	L	Pct.	GB	Home	Road
^{(2)} Cleveland Indians	89	73	.549	—	46‍–‍35	43‍–‍38
Chicago White Sox	80	82	.494	9	44‍–‍37	36‍–‍45
Kansas City Royals	72	89	.447	16½	29‍–‍51	43‍–‍38
Minnesota Twins	70	92	.432	19	35‍–‍46	35‍–‍46
Detroit Tigers	65	97	.401	24	32‍–‍49	33‍–‍48

AL West
Team	W	L	Pct.	GB	Home	Road
^{(3)} Texas Rangers	88	74	.543	—	48‍–‍33	40‍–‍41
Anaheim Angels	85	77	.525	3	42‍–‍39	43‍–‍38
Seattle Mariners	76	85	.472	11½	42‍–‍39	34‍–‍46
Oakland Athletics	74	88	.457	14	39‍–‍42	35‍–‍46

=== National League ===
NL East
Team	W	L	Pct.	GB	Home	Road
^{(1)} Atlanta Braves	106	56	.654	—	56‍–‍25	50‍–‍31
New York Mets	88	74	.543	18	47‍–‍34	41‍–‍40
Philadelphia Phillies	75	87	.463	31	40‍–‍41	35‍–‍46
Montreal Expos	65	97	.401	41	39‍–‍42	26‍–‍55
Florida Marlins	54	108	.333	52	31‍–‍50	23‍–‍58

NL Central
Team	W	L	Pct.	GB	Home	Road
^{(2)} Houston Astros	102	60	.630	—	55‍–‍26	47‍–‍34
^{(4)} Chicago Cubs	90	73	.552	12½	51‍–‍31	39‍–‍42
St. Louis Cardinals	83	79	.512	19	48‍–‍34	35‍–‍45
Cincinnati Reds	77	85	.475	25	39‍–‍42	38‍–‍43
Milwaukee Brewers	74	88	.457	28	38‍–‍43	36‍–‍45
Pittsburgh Pirates	69	93	.426	33	40‍–‍40	29‍–‍53

NL West
Team	W	L	Pct.	GB	Home	Road
^{(3)} San Diego Padres	98	64	.605	—	54‍–‍27	44‍–‍37
San Francisco Giants	89	74	.546	9½	49‍–‍32	40‍–‍42
Los Angeles Dodgers	83	79	.512	15	48‍–‍33	35‍–‍46
Colorado Rockies	77	85	.475	21	42‍–‍39	35‍–‍46
Arizona Diamondbacks	65	97	.401	33	34‍–‍47	31‍–‍50

- The Chicago Cubs defeated the San Francisco Giants in a one-game playoff to earn the NL Wild Card.

== Postseason ==
This was the first season in which teams were seeded by their respective win–loss record within their respective leagues.

- Division Champions were seeded 1–3.
- Wild Cards were automatically seeded 4 (regardless of having a better record than a Division Champion).
- The team with the better regular season record in the first two rounds had home-field advantage, with the wild card never having home-field until the World Series.
- The Division Series pitted the No. 1 seeded Division Champion against the No. 4 seeded Wild Card, while the No. 2 seeded faced the No. 3 seeded Division Champion.
  - If the No. 1 seeded Division Champion and the Wild Card were in the same division, the No. 1 seeded Division Champion would instead face the No. 3 seeded Division Champion while the No. 2 seeded Division Champion would face the No. 4 seeded Wild Card.
- Home-field advantage in the World Series was still based on yearly rotation at this time (until that changed in 2003).
- This was also the first season in which the Division Series was conducted under a 2–2–1 format. The higher seed hosted Games 1–2 and 5 (if necessary). The lower seeded team would host Games 3 and 4 (Game 4, if necessary). Previously, the team with home-field advantage in all best-of-5 postseason series (LCS from 1969 to 1984, LDS from 1981, 1995–1997) were conducted in a 2–3 format where the team with home-field advantage would have to open on the road for the first two games, while hosting the final three games (if Games 4 & 5 are necessary).

=== Bracket ===
Division Series (ALDS, NLDS)
1	NY Yankees	3
3	Texas	0
American League
2	Cleveland	3
4	Boston	1
1	Atlanta	3
4	Chicago Cubs	0
National League
2	Houston	1
3	San Diego	3

League Championship Series (ALCS, NLCS)
1	NY Yankees	4
2	Cleveland	2
1	Atlanta	2
3	San Diego	4

World Series
AL1	NY Yankees	4
NL3	San Diego	0

== Awards and honors ==
- Baseball Hall of Fame
  - George Davis
  - Larry Doby
  - Lee MacPhail
  - Bullet Rogan
  - Don Sutton

Baseball Writers' Association of America Awards
BBWAA Award	National League	American League
Rookie of the Year	Kerry Wood (CHC)	Ben Grieve (OAK)
Cy Young Award	Tom Glavine (ATL)	Roger Clemens (TOR)
Manager of the Year	Larry Dierker (HOU)	Joe Torre (NYY)
Most Valuable Player	Sammy Sosa (CHC)	Juan González (TEX)
Gold Glove Awards
Position	National League	American League
Pitcher	Greg Maddux (ATL)	Mike Mussina (BAL)
Catcher	Charles Johnson (FLA)	Iván Rodríguez (TEX)
First Baseman	J. T. Snow (SF)	Rafael Palmeiro (BAL)
Second Baseman	Bret Boone (CIN)	Roberto Alomar (CLE)
Third Baseman	Scott Rolen (PHI)	Robin Ventura (CWS)
Shortstop	Rey Ordonez (NYM)	Omar Vizquel (CLE)
Outfielders	Barry Bonds (SF)	Bernie Williams (NYY)
Outfielders	Larry Walker (COL)	Jim Edmonds (ANA)
Outfielders	Andruw Jones (ATL)	Ken Griffey Jr. (SEA)
Silver Slugger Awards
Pitcher/Designated Hitter	Tom Glavine (ATL)	Jose Canseco (TOR)
Catcher	Mike Piazza (NYM)	Iván Rodríguez (TEX)
First Baseman	Mark McGwire (STL)	Rafael Palmeiro (BAL)
Second Baseman	Craig Biggio (HOU)	Damion Easley (DET)
Third Baseman	Vinny Castilla (COL)	Dean Palmer (KC)
Shortstop	Barry Larkin (CIN)	Alex Rodriguez (SEA)
Outfielders	Moisés Alou (HOU)	Albert Belle (CWS)
Outfielders	Sammy Sosa (CHC)	Juan González (TEX)
Outfielders	Greg Vaughn (SD)	Ken Griffey Jr. (SEA)

=== Other awards ===
- Outstanding Designated Hitter Award: Edgar Martínez (SEA)
- Roberto Clemente Award (Humanitarian): Sammy Sosa (CHC).
- Rolaids Relief Man Award: Tom Gordon (BOS, American); Trevor Hoffman (SD, National).

=== Player of the Month ===
Month	American League	National League
April	Iván Rodríguez	Mark McGwire
May	Bernie Williams	Mark McGwire
June	Rafael Palmeiro	Sammy Sosa
July	Albert Belle	Vladimir Guerrero
August	Derek Jeter	Jeff Kent
September	Albert Belle	Mark McGwire

=== Pitcher of the Month ===
Month	American League	National League
April	Chuck Finley	Tom Glavine
May	Hideki Irabu	Orel Hershiser
June	Bartolo Colón	Greg Maddux
July	David Cone	Chan Ho Park
August	Roger Clemens	Randy Johnson
September	Rick Helling	Randy Johnson

== MLB statistical leaders ==
Statistic	American League		National League	
AVG	Bernie Williams NYY	.339	Larry Walker COL	.363
HR	Ken Griffey Jr. SEA	56	Mark McGwire STL	70
RBI	Juan González TEX	157	Sammy Sosa CHC	158
Wins	Roger Clemens^{1} TOR; David Cone NYY; Rick Helling TEX	20	Tom Glavine ATL	20
ERA	Roger Clemens^{1} TOR	2.65	Greg Maddux ATL	2.22
SO	Roger Clemens^{1} TOR	271	Curt Schilling PHI	300
SV	Tom Gordon BOS	46	Trevor Hoffman SD	53
SB	Rickey Henderson OAK	66	Tony Womack PIT	58

^{1} American League Triple Crown pitching winner

== Managers ==
=== American League ===
Team	Manager	Notes
Anaheim Angels	Terry Collins	
Baltimore Orioles	Ray Miller	
Boston Red Sox	Jimy Williams	
Chicago White Sox	Jerry Manuel	
Cleveland Indians	Mike Hargrove	
Detroit Tigers	Buddy Bell, Larry Parrish	Bell (52–85, .380), Parrish (13–12, .520)
Kansas City Royals	Tony Muser	
Minnesota Twins	Tom Kelly	
New York Yankees	Joe Torre	Won the World Series
Oakland Athletics	Art Howe	
Seattle Mariners	Lou Piniella	
Tampa Bay Devil Rays	Larry Rothschild	Expansion team
Texas Rangers	Johnny Oates	
Toronto Blue Jays	Tim Johnson	

=== National League ===
Team	Manager	Notes
Arizona Diamondbacks	Buck Showalter	Expansion team
Atlanta Braves	Bobby Cox	
Chicago Cubs	Jim Riggleman	
Cincinnati Reds	Jack McKeon	
Colorado Rockies	Don Baylor	
Florida Marlins	Jim Leyland	
Houston Astros	Larry Dierker	
Los Angeles Dodgers	Bill Russell, Glenn Hoffman	Russell (36–38, .486), Hoffman (47–41, .534)
Milwaukee Brewers	Phil Garner	
Montreal Expos	Felipe Alou	
New York Mets	Bobby Valentine	
Philadelphia Phillies	Terry Francona	
Pittsburgh Pirates	Gene Lamont	
St. Louis Cardinals	Tony La Russa	
San Diego Padres	Bruce Bochy	Won National League pennant
San Francisco Giants	Dusty Baker	

== Home field attendance and payroll ==
Team name	Wins	%±	Home attendance	%±	Per game	Est. payroll	%±
Colorado Rockies	77	−7.2%	3,792,683	−2.5%	46,823	$50,484,648	15.9%
Baltimore Orioles	79	−19.4%	3,684,650	−0.7%	45,490	$72,525,634	23.9%
Arizona Diamondbacks	65		3,610,290		44,571	$32,347,000	
Cleveland Indians	89	3.5%	3,467,299	1.8%	42,806	$61,718,166	8.7%
Atlanta Braves	106	5.0%	3,360,860	−3.0%	41,492	$61,186,000	17.0%
St. Louis Cardinals	83	13.7%	3,195,691	21.3%	38,972	$54,672,521	20.3%
Los Angeles Dodgers	83	−5.7%	3,089,222	−6.9%	38,139	$48,820,000	7.6%
New York Yankees	114	18.8%	2,955,193	14.5%	36,484	$66,806,867	7.3%
Texas Rangers	88	14.3%	2,927,399	−0.6%	36,141	$56,752,095	6.2%
Seattle Mariners	76	−15.6%	2,651,511	−16.9%	32,735	$54,802,036	31.9%
Chicago Cubs	90	32.4%	2,623,194	19.8%	31,990	$50,838,000	20.6%
San Diego Padres	98	28.9%	2,555,874	22.3%	31,554	$46,861,500	25.4%
Anaheim Angels	85	1.2%	2,519,280	42.5%	31,102	$41,791,000	34.2%
Tampa Bay Devil Rays	63		2,506,293		30,942	$27,280,000	
Houston Astros	102	21.4%	2,458,451	20.1%	30,351	$42,374,000	21.8%
Toronto Blue Jays	88	15.8%	2,454,303	−5.2%	30,300	$51,376,000	9.1%
Boston Red Sox	92	17.9%	2,314,704	4.0%	28,577	$56,927,000	30.7%
New York Mets	88	0.0%	2,287,948	29.5%	28,246	$52,247,999	31.3%
San Francisco Giants	89	−1.1%	1,925,364	13.9%	23,770	$42,738,334	20.1%
Milwaukee Brewers	74	−5.1%	1,811,593	25.5%	22,365	$34,139,904	44.3%
Cincinnati Reds	77	1.3%	1,793,649	0.4%	22,144	$23,005,000	−53.8%
Florida Marlins	54	−41.3%	1,730,384	−26.8%	21,363	$41,864,667	−14.0%
Philadelphia Phillies	75	10.3%	1,715,722	15.1%	21,182	$36,297,500	−1.0%
Pittsburgh Pirates	69	−12.7%	1,560,950	−5.8%	19,271	$15,065,000	39.9%
Kansas City Royals	72	7.5%	1,494,875	−1.5%	18,686	$38,097,500	9.4%
Detroit Tigers	65	−17.7%	1,409,391	3.2%	17,400	$24,265,000	40.5%
Chicago White Sox	80	0.0%	1,391,146	−25.4%	16,965	$39,850,000	−31.0%
Oakland Athletics	74	13.8%	1,232,343	−2.5%	15,214	$21,473,000	−10.6%
Minnesota Twins	70	2.9%	1,165,976	−17.4%	14,395	$28,097,500	−17.5%
Montreal Expos	65	−16.7%	914,909	−38.9%	11,295	$10,641,500	−44.8%

== Television coverage ==
This was the third season under the five-year rights agreements with ESPN, Fox and NBC. ESPN continued to air Sunday Night Baseball and Wednesday Night Baseball. Fox's coverage included Fox Saturday Baseball broadcasts, Thursday night games on Fox Sports Net and Saturday primetime games on FX. NBC aired the All-Star Game. During the postseason, ESPN, Fox and NBC split the four Division Series. NBC then televised the American League Championship Series while Fox aired both the National League Championship Series and the World Series.

== Events ==
=== January–March ===
- January 5 – Don Sutton, a 324-game winner, is elected to the Baseball Hall of Fame on his fifth try. Sutton, who missed election by nine votes in 1990, is named on 81.6% of the ballots.
- February 2 – New York Yankees general manager Bob Watson announces his resignation. He is replaced by 30-year-old Brian Cashman.
- February 18 – Long-time Chicago Cubs television and radio announcer Harry Caray dies at the age of 83.
- March 3 – Larry Doby, Lee MacPhail, George Davis and Bullet Joe Rogan are elected to the Hall of Fame by the Veterans Committee.
- March 31 – The Tampa Bay Devil Rays lose to the Detroit Tigers 11–6, in their first game ever. Pitcher Wilson Álvarez takes the loss for Tampa Bay while third baseman Wade Boggs hit the first home run in team history and drives in three runs.
- March 31 – The Arizona Diamondbacks drop a 9–2 decision to the Colorado Rockies in their first game ever. Andy Benes is tagged with the loss, and rookies Travis Lee, who gets three hits, and Karim García hit the franchises second home run. Vinny Castilla drives in five runs for Colorado.
- March 31 – The New York Mets beat rival Philadelphia Phillies 1–0 in the longest scoreless opening day game in the National League and the longest one in the MLB since 1926 when the Washington Senators beat the Philadelphia Athletics 1–0 in 15 innings when backup catcher Alberto Castillo delivered a full-count, two-out, pinch-hit single to right with the bases loaded off Philadelphia closer Ricky Bottalico.

=== April–June ===
- April 1 – The expansion Tampa Bay Devil Rays win their first game in franchise history, beating the Tigers 11–8. Fred McGriff has four RBI on three hits.
- April 2 – By hitting a home run in Colorado's 6–4 win over Arizona at Bank One Ballpark, Rockies outfielder Ellis Burks sets a major league record by having homered in 33 different stadiums.
- April 5 – The Arizona Diamondbacks win their first game in franchise history 3–2, over the San Francisco Giants. Andy Benes gets the win for the 1–5 D'backs.
- April 10 – The Los Angeles Dodgers' Mike Piazza becomes the fifth NL player in history to hit grand slams in consecutive games by homering in a 7–2 win over the Houston Astros. Piazza also homered with the bags full, while driving in six runs, in last night's 7–2 win over Arizona. He'll hit another on April 24 to tie the major-league record for slams in a month.
- April 13 – The Seattle Mariners' Ken Griffey Jr. slugs two home runs in a 6–5 loss to the Cleveland Indians. In doing so, he becomes the second–youngest player in big league history to reach 300 homers for his career, at 28 years and 143 days. Jimmie Foxx, at 27 years 328 days, was younger.
- May 3 – The Seattle Mariners' Dan Wilson becomes just the seventh catcher in major league history to hit an inside-the-park grand slam, as Seattle defeats Detroit 10–6. It's a first for the Mariners and the first in the AL since Mike Greenwell did it on September 1, 1990.
- May 6 – Chicago Cubs rookie right-hander Kerry Wood set the National League record and became the third major league player to strike out 20 batters for strikeouts in a single nine-inning game in a 2–0 win over the Houston Astros. The 20-year-old ties the record held by Roger Clemens, who performed the feat twice. The only Houston baserunners come from an infield single to Ricky Gutiérrez in the 3rd inning and a hit batter. Wood also becomes the second pitcher in baseball history to record a single-game strikeout total equal to his age (in 1936, 17-year-old Bob Feller struck out 17 batters). Wood strikes out the first five batters of the game, and seven in a row between the 7th and 9th innings, tying Jamie Moyer's Cubs record for most consecutive strikeouts.
- May 11 – In a 4–2 win over Arizona, Kerry Wood strikes out 13 Diamondbacks in seven innings. By doing so, Wood sets a major league record with 33 strikeouts over two consecutive games.
- May 13 – The Atlanta Braves set an NL record by homering in their 25th straight game, a 10–2 win over the St. Louis Cardinals. This ties the major league mark held by the 1941 Yankees and the 1994 Tigers. The streak will be stopped by the Cardinals the next day.
- May 15 – In one of the biggest trades in recent years, the Dodgers send All-Star catcher Mike Piazza and third baseman Todd Zeile to the Florida Marlins in exchange for outfielders Gary Sheffield and Jim Eisenreich, catcher Charles Johnson, third baseman Bobby Bonilla, and pitcher Manuel Barrios. On May 22, the Mets will acquire Piazza from the Marlins in exchange for outfielder Preston Wilson, pitcher Ed Yarnall and a minor league player.
- May 17 – Yankees pitcher David Wells hurls the 15th perfect game in modern major league history with a 4–0 win over the Minnesota Twins. Wells fans 11 batters in his masterpiece. Bernie Williams strokes three hits for New York, including a home run.
- May 18 – The Oakland Athletics' Mike Blowers hits for the cycle and drives home four runs in the A's 14–0 win over the White Sox. Blowers become only the second player in franchise history to accomplish the feat.
- May 19 – The Cardinals' Mark McGwire hits three home runs in a game for the second time this season, leading St. Louis to a 10–8 victory over the Philadelphia Phillies. He is only the 12th player in history to have a pair of 3–HR games in the same season. McGwire drives in six of the Cardinal runs as he reaches the 20 home run mark faster than other player in history.
- May 25 – Cleveland's David Bell becomes the third player in major league history to play against a team managed by his father. Bell's two–run double brings home the go–ahead run in the Indians 7–4 win over Buddy Bell's Detroit Tigers. Bump Wills and Moisés Alou are the only other players to appear in games against their fathers (Maury Wills and Felipe Alou).
- May 28 – With Arizona leading the Giants, 8–6, in the bottom of the 9th with the bases loaded, manager Buck Showalter orders reliever Gregg Olson to intentionally walk Barry Bonds to bring home the Giants' 7th run. It is only the fourth bases–loaded intentional walk in major league history, and the first since Bill "Swish" Nicholson on July 23, 1944.
- June 6 – Hall of Fame second baseman Joe Morgan has his uniform number 8 retired by the Cincinnati Reds in a ceremony at Cinergy Field.

=== July–September ===
- July 5 – Roger Clemens of the Toronto Blue Jays records his 3,000th career strikeout in the Jays' 2–1 win over the Tampa Bay Devil Rays. Tampa left fielder Randy Winn is the victim of Clemens' milestone.
- June 7 – At Camden Yards, Hall of Famer Eddie Murray has his uniform number 33 retired by the Baltimore Orioles.
- June 10 – Colorado's Dante Bichette becomes the first Rockies player ever to hit for the cycle in the team's 9–8, 10–inning victory over the Rangers.
- June 10 – The New York Yankees' Tim Raines steals the 800th base of his career in the Yankees' 6–2 win over the Montreal Expos. He is the fifth player in history to reach the milestone.
- June 15 – Sammy Sosa hits three home runs, helping the Chicago Cubs beat the Milwaukee Brewers 6–5.
- June 20 – The Cleveland Indians retire Bob Lemon's uniform number 19 prior to the team's 5–3 loss to the Yankees.
- June 30 – The Chicago Cubs' Sammy Sosa hits his 33rd home run of the season in a game against the Arizona Diamondbacks. Sosa's 20th home run in the month of June is a new MLB record for most home runs in one month.
- July 7 – The American League defeats the National League 13–8, in the 69th All–Star Game at Coors Field in Denver. Baltimore's Roberto Alomar is named the game's MVP, going 3–for–4 with a home run, one RBI, one stolen base, and two runs scored.
- July 9 – Bud Selig is elected as the ninth Commissioner of Baseball by a vote of club owners.
- July 17 – Rafael Palmeiro hits his 300th career home run, helping the Baltimore Orioles beat the Anaheim Angels 4–1.
- July 26 – Trevor Hoffman's bid to set a major league record with 42 straight saves ended when the San Diego closer gives up a home run to Moisés Alou on his first delivery in the ninth inning, tying the game. The Padres defeat Houston 5–4 in the 10th, but Hoffman blows his chance at history.
- July 31 – The Houston Astros acquire flame-throwing pitcher Randy Johnson of the Seattle Mariners for three minor league players; Johnson caught fire upon arriving in Houston. In 11 regular-season starts with the Astros, he had a 10–1 record, a 1.28 ERA, and 116 strikeouts in 84 1/3 innings, and pitched 4 shutouts. Johnson finished seventh in the National League Cy Young voting despite pitching only two months in the league, and helped Houston win their second straight National League Central division title.
- August 3 – C. J. Nitkowski of the Houston Astros tied a Major League record by becoming the fifth pitcher to hit three consecutive batters by pitch, the first since 1977, in a game against the Florida Marlins.
- August 4 – Carlos Delgado of the Toronto Blue Jays hits three home runs, but the Jays lose to the Texas Rangers 11–9 in Arlington.
- August 9 – Dennis Martínez of the Atlanta Braves defeats the San Francisco Giants 7–5, for his 244th career victory, to set the record for most wins by a Latin American pitcher. Juan Marichal held the old mark. Chipper Jones backs Martínez' pitching with four hits and four RBI.
- August 13 – Harold Baines of the Baltimore Orioles becomes the all–time leader in RBI by a designated hitter when he drives in his 824th in a 7–4 win over the Indians. Hal McRae was the previous record holder.
- August 14 – Baltimore catcher Chris Hoiles becomes the ninth player – and first catcher – to hit two grand slams in a single game, doing so in a 15–3 win over the Cleveland Indians.
- August 23 – Barry Bonds swats his 400th career home run, a two-run shot off Kirt Ojala, in the San Francisco Giants' 10–5 victory over the Florida Marlins.
- August 25 – The Toronto Blue Jays' Roger Clemens strikes out 18 in a 3–0 victory over the Kansas City Royals. He becomes the first pitcher ever to record three games of 18 or more strikeouts. Clemens allows only three hits and does not walk a batter.
- August 31 – Oakland's Rickey Henderson scores the 2,000th run of his career in the Athletics' 15–6 loss to Cleveland. He joins Ty Cobb, Hank Aaron, Babe Ruth, Pete Rose and Willie Mays as the only players to reach the milestone.
- August 31 – Chicago's Kerry Wood throws 135 pitches in a game against a mediocre Cincinnati Reds team and wakes up the next morning with a sore right elbow. It is the 9th game of the season that manager Jim Riggleman allowed the 20-year old rookie to throw more than 120 pitches. The Cubs decided to shut-down the super-star for the remainder of the regular season. Kerry would return for one game in the playoffs, before blowing out his elbow in spring training the next year.
- September 4 – The New York Yankees win their 100th game of the season, defeating the Chicago White Sox 11–6. The Yankees reach that mark five days faster than the 1906 Chicago Cubs and 1954 Cleveland Indians.
- September 5 – Mark McGwire becomes the third player in major league history to reach 60 home runs, as the St. Louis Cardinals beat the Cincinnati Reds 7–0. McGwire joins Babe Ruth and Roger Maris with 60 home runs in a single season.
- September 6 – Atlanta's Andruw Jones hits his 50th career home run in a 4–0 win over the New York Mets. He becomes the third–youngest player in history to reach that level; only Mel Ott and Tony Conigliaro did so at a younger age.
- September 7 – Ken Griffey Jr. hits his fiftieth home run of the season, becoming the third player (Babe Ruth and Mark McGwire) to hit 50 or more home runs in consecutive seasons.
- September 8 – Mark McGwire breaks Roger Maris' 37-year-old home run record, lining historic No. 62 just over the wall in left field with two outs in the fourth inning. McGwire's solo shot off the Chicago Cubs' Steve Trachsel—among the shortest he would hit all year—sets off a wild celebration at Busch Stadium. The Cubs' Sammy Sosa, who hit his 58th home run earlier in the game, is on the field to congratulate McGwire, creating an iconic image of the 1998 home run race. In the sixth inning of the same game, the Cardinals' J. D. Drew makes his major league debut pinch-hitting for pitcher Kent Mercker.
- September 11 – The Florida Marlins lose to the Atlanta Braves 8–2, becoming the first World Series champion in history to lose 100 games the next season.
- September 15 – Ken Griffey Jr. hits homer #52 and drives in the 1,000th run of his career in the Mariners' 12–7 win over the Minnesota Twins. He becomes the fourth–youngest player in history to reach the milestone, after Mel Ott, Jimmie Foxx and Lou Gehrig. A day later, Griffey would collect his 20th stolen base of the season to become just the third player in major league history to record at least 50 homers and 20 steals in the same season; Willie Mays and Brady Anderson are the others.
- September 16 – Mike Piazza hits his 200th career home run, helping the New York Mets beat the Houston Astros 4–3.
- September 17 – Denny Neagle puts the Atlanta Braves pitching staff into the baseball record books as he limits the Arizona Diamondbacks to four hits in six innings for a 1–0 win. Neagle improves to 15–11, making the Braves (featuring Neagle, Tom Glavine, Greg Maddux, John Smoltz, and Kevin Millwood) the first major league team with five 15-game winners since the 1930 Washington Senators.
- September 19 – Alex Rodriguez of the Seattle Mariners hits his 40th home run of the season and becomes the third player (after José Canseco and Barry Bonds) to join the 40–40 club.
- September 20 – Cal Ripken Jr. of the Baltimore Orioles takes himself out of the lineup prior to the game with the New York Yankees to end his major league record consecutive game streak at 2,632. The Orioles lose the historic game by a score of 5–4. Ryan Minor, Ripken's replacement at third base, gets one hit in four at bats.
- September 21 – Jason Kendall of the Pittsburgh Pirates steals his 26th base of the season to set a new NL record for catchers. The previous mark was set by John Stearns in 1978.
- September 23 – At Milwaukee County Stadium, Sammy Sosa hits his 64th and 65th home runs as the Chicago Cubs jump out to a 7–0 lead against the Milwaukee Brewers. However, the Brewers erase the deficit by scoring eight runs in the last three innings, the last three coming when Brant Brown drops a Geoff Jenkins fly ball with two out in the ninth inning; the error allows Mark Loretta, Jeff Cirillo and Jeromy Burnitz to score. The Cubs stay tied with the San Francisco Giants for the wild-card lead when they could have led by one game with three games left. Ironically, the error comes 90 years to the day of Fred Merkle's baserunning mistake, which led to the Cubs ultimately winning the National League pennant and, to date, their last World Series title.
- September 23 – Second baseman Craig Biggio of the Houston Astros steals his 50th base of the year and becomes the first player since Tris Speaker in 1912 to hit 50 doubles and steal 50 bases in a season, as the Astros beat the St. Louis Cardinals 7–1.
- September 24 – Boston Red Sox pitcher Tom Gordon records his 42nd consecutive save of the year for a new major league mark as Boston defeats the Baltimore Orioles 9–6. Rod Beck and Trevor Hoffman shared the old mark.
- September 25 – Just hours after Sammy Sosa hits his league-leading 66th home run, pulling ahead of Mark McGwire for the first time all season, McGwire hits his 66th in a game against the Montreal Expos.
- September 26 – Dennis Eckersley of the Boston Red Sox gets a standing ovation from the Fenway Park crowd as he appears in his 1,071st game, breaking Hoyt Wilhelm's record for most appearances by a pitcher. However, the Red Sox lose to Baltimore 5–2.
- September 26 – The St. Louis Cardinals' Mark McGwire hits his 67th and 68th home runs against the Montreal Expos, pulling two ahead of the Chicago Cubs' Sammy Sosa, who goes 2-for-4 but fails to homer against the Houston Astros.
- September 27 – The Cincinnati Reds defeat the Pittsburgh Pirates, 4–1. Cincinnati uses a pair of brothers in the infield: Bret Boone (second base) and his brother Aaron (third base); Barry Larkin (shortstop) and his brother Stephen (first base).
- September 27 – In the St. Louis Cardinals' final game of the season, Mark McGwire hits two home runs against the Montreal Expos for the second straight night, establishing a new MLB record with 70 home runs in a season. Sammy Sosa fails to hit a home run in the Cubs' 4–3 loss to the Houston Astros, leaving him at 66 homers. However, the Cubs' loss forces a one-game playoff with the San Francisco Giants for the National League wild card, giving Sosa one final chance to reach McGwire.
- September 27 – In the San Diego Padres' final regular season game, left fielder Greg Vaughn hits his 50th home run of the season, a career high and a San Diego Padres record for home runs in a season. This marks the first time in major league history that four players – Vaughn (50), Griffey (56), Sosa (66) and McGwire (70) – hit at least 50 home runs in the same season. Also during this game, Trevor Hoffman records his 53rd save of the season, tying the National League record set by the Cubs' Randy Myers in 1993.
- September 27 – The New York Yankees win their seventh-straight game, defeating the Tampa Bay Devil Rays 8–3. The Yankees finish the season with an American League record 114 wins.
- September 27 – In recording his first-ever Major League win, a 2–1 decision over the Detroit Tigers at the SkyDome, Roy Halladay of the Toronto Blue Jays, a week removed from his Major League debut, has what would have been the second no-hitter in Blue Jay history broken up by a Bobby Higginson home run with two out in the ninth, the only hit he will allow. The no-hitter also would have been the third to be pitched on the final day of a regular season, joining the combination of Vida Blue, Glenn Abbott, Paul Lindblad and Rollie Fingers in 1975 and Mike Witt's perfect game in 1984. The home run ball is caught, ironically, by Dave Stieb, himself a three-time victim of a no-hitter being broken up with two out in the ninth (his last two starts of the 1988 season and a perfect game bid in 1989) before finally pitching the Blue Jays' only no-hitter to date, in 1990.
- September 28 – In a one-game playoff, the Chicago Cubs defeat the San Francisco Giants 5–3 to secure the final playoff spot in the National League. For the third game in a row, the Cubs' Sammy Sosa gets two hits, but no home runs, leaving him at 66 home runs for the season, four fewer than Mark McGwire, who pulled ahead of Sosa with five home runs in his final three games.

=== October–December ===
- October 3 – The Chicago Cubs are defeated by the Atlanta Braves in the National League Divisional Series.
- October 21 – The New York Yankees win the World Series, sweeping the San Diego Padres in four straight games. Yankees third baseman Scott Brosius is named the Series MVP. The Yankees end the season with a major league record 125 combined regular season and postseason wins.
- Tom Glavine of the Atlanta Braves wins his second National League Cy Young Award in an extremely close vote over two San Diego Padres pitchers: Trevor Hoffman and Kevin Brown. Glavine, who receives 11 first-place votes to Hoffman's 13 (Brown receives the remaining 8), becomes the first National League pitcher since the league instituted its four-vote system in 1970 to win the award despite receiving fewer first-place votes than another player. Glavine tallied 99 points (Hoffman – 88, Brown – 76), with 5 points being awarded for each first place vote, 3 for each second-place vote, 2 for third, and 1 for fourth. Another oddity is the fact that Hoffman, Brown, and Rod Beck (who did not receive a single point in the Cy Young Award voting) finished higher than Glavine in the MVP voting, despite Glavine's Braves finishing with the best record in the National League.
- November 9 – It is revealed that Hall of Fame pitcher Jim "Catfish" Hunter is suffering from amyotrophic lateral sclerosis, the progressive, ultimately fatal neurological condition better known as Lou Gehrig's disease.
- November 30 – The Arizona Diamondbacks sign free agent Randy Johnson to a four-year contract worth approximately $50 million.
- December 12 – The Dodgers set the salary bar higher by signing free agent Kevin Brown to a seven-year, $105 million contract, the largest in the majors.

== See also ==
- 1998 Nippon Professional Baseball season
