= 1998 Philadelphia Phillies season =

Major League Baseball season

1998 Philadelphia Phillies
- League: National League
- Division: East
- Ballpark: Veterans Stadium
- City: Philadelphia
- Record: 75–87 (.463)
- Divisional place: 3rd
- Owners: Bill Giles
- General managers: Ed Wade
- Managers: Terry Francona
- Television: WPHL-TV; Comcast Sports Philadelphia
- Radio: WPHT (Harry Kalas, Larry Andersen, Andy Musser, Chris Wheeler)

The 1998 Philadelphia Phillies season was the 116th season in the history of the franchise.

== Regular season ==
The first game of the Phillies season was an unforgettable opening day game at Shea Stadium against their division rival New York Mets. Both of them were involved in the longest scoreless opening day game in the National League and the longest one in the MLB since 1926 when the Washington Senators beat the Philadelphia Athletics 1–0 in 15 innings. However, the Phillies lost the game 1–0 in 14 innings when Mets backup catcher Alberto Castillo delivered a full-count, two-out, pinch-hit single to right with the bases loaded off Philadelphia closer Ricky Bottalico. This was the first regular season baseball game played in New York in March.

=== Season standings ===
NL East
Team	W	L	Pct.	GB	Home	Road
Atlanta Braves	106	56	.654	—	56‍–‍25	50‍–‍31
New York Mets	88	74	.543	18	47‍–‍34	41‍–‍40
Philadelphia Phillies	75	87	.463	31	40‍–‍41	35‍–‍46
Montreal Expos	65	97	.401	41	39‍–‍42	26‍–‍55
Florida Marlins	54	108	.333	52	31‍–‍50	23‍–‍58

=== Record vs. opponents ===
1998 National League record Source: MLB Standings Grid – 1998
Team	AZ	ATL	CHC	CIN	COL	FLA	HOU	LAD	MIL	MON	NYM	PHI	PIT	SD	SF	STL	AL
Arizona	—	1–8	5–7	4–5	6–6	6–2	4–5	4–8	6–3	2–7	4–5	2–7	6–3	3–9	5–7	2–7	5–8
Atlanta	8–1	—	3–6	7–2	5–3	7–5	4–5	8–1	7–2	6–6	9–3	8–4	7–2	5–4	7–2	6–3	9–7
Chicago	7–5	6–3	—	6–5	7–2	7–2	4–7	4–5	6–6	7–2	4–5	3–6	8–3	5–4	7–3	4–7	5–8
Cincinnati	5–4	2–7	5–6	—	4–5	9–0	3–8	5–4	6–5	8–1	3–6	4–5	5–7	1–11	2–7	8–3	7-6
Colorado	6–6	3–5	2–7	5–4	—	6–3	6–5	6–6	4–7	7–2	3–6	5–4	5–4	5–7	7–5	3–6	4–8
Florida	2–6	5–7	2–7	0–9	3–6	—	3–6	4–5	0–9	5–7	5–7	6–6	3–6	4–5	0–9	4–5	8–8
Houston	5–4	5–4	7–4	8–3	5–6	6–3	—	3–6	9–2	7–2	5–4	7–2	9–2	5–4	6–3	5–7	10–4
Los Angeles	8–4	1–8	5–4	4–5	6–6	5–4	6–3	—	5–4	5–4	3–5	5–4	7–5	5–7	6–6	4–5	8–5
Milwaukee	3–6	2–7	6–6	5–6	7–4	9–0	2–9	4–5	—	6–3	1–8	4–5	6–5	3–6	5–4	3–8	8–6
Montreal	7–2	6–6	2–7	1–8	2–7	7–5	2–7	4–5	3–6	—	8–4	5–7	2–7	4–4	3–6	3–6	6–10
New York	5–4	3–9	5–4	6–3	6–3	7–5	4–5	5–3	8–1	4–8	—	8–4	4–5	4–5	4–5	6–3	9–7
Philadelphia	7-2	4–8	6–3	5–4	4–5	6–6	2–7	4–5	5–4	7–5	4–8	—	8–1	1–8	2–6	3–6	7–9
Pittsburgh	3–6	2–7	3–8	7–5	4–5	6–3	2–9	5–7	5–6	7–2	5–4	1–8	—	5–4	2–7	6–5	6–7
San Diego	9–3	4–5	4–5	11–1	7–5	5–4	4–5	7–5	6–3	4–4	5–4	8–1	4–5	—	8–4	6–3	6–7
San Francisco	7–5	2–7	3–7	7–2	5–7	9–0	3–6	6–6	4–5	6–3	5–4	6–2	7–2	4–8	—	7–5	8–5
St. Louis	7–2	3–6	7–4	3–8	6–3	5-4	7–5	5–4	8–3	6–3	3–6	6–3	5–6	3–6	5–7	—	4–9

=== Transactions ===
- February 24, 1998: Midre Cummings was released by the Philadelphia Phillies.
- June 2, 1998: Pat Burrell was drafted by the Philadelphia Phillies in the 1st round (1st pick) of the 1998 amateur draft. Player signed July 24, 1998.
- June 24, 1998: Rex Hudler was released by the Philadelphia Phillies.
- August 14, 1998: Paul Byrd was selected off waivers by the Philadelphia Phillies from the Atlanta Braves.

=== Roster ===
1998 Philadelphia Phillies
Roster
Pitchers: 55 Matt Beech; 39 Toby Borland; 52 Ricky Bottalico; 49 Billy Brewer; 34 Paul Byrd; 57 Robert Dodd; 61 Wayne Gomes; 44 Mike Grace; 28 Tyler Green; 31 Mark Leiter; 46 Carlton Loewer; 35 Ryan Nye; 45 Yorkis Pérez; 21 Mark Portugal; 51 Ken Ryan; 38 Curt Schilling; 48 Jerry Spradlin; 54 Garrett Stephenson; 47 Mike Welch; 37 Matt Whiteside; 58 Darrin Winston	Catchers: 14 Gary Bennett; 27 Bobby Estalella; 24 Mike Lieberthal; 8 Mark Parent; Infielders: 16 Marlon Anderson; 26 Alex Arias; 2 Rico Brogna; 23 Kevin Jordan; 5 Mark Lewis; 30 Desi Relaford; 17 Scott Rolen	Outfielders: 53 Bobby Abreu; 33 Rubén Amaro, Jr.; 6 Doug Glanville; 14 Rex Hudler; 25 Gregg Jefferies; 29 Wendell Magee; 11 Kevin Sefcik; 40 Jon Zuber	Manager: 7 Terry Francona; Coaches: 42 Galen Cisco (Pitching); 3 Chuck Cottier; 59 Ramon Henderson (Bullpen); 56 Hal McRae (Batting); 9 Brad Mills (First Base); 18 John Vukovich

== Player stats ==
=== Batting ===
==== Starters by position ====
Note: Pos = Position; G = Games played; AB = At bats; H = Hits; Avg. = Batting average; HR = Home runs; RBI = Runs batted in

Pos	Player	G	AB	H	Avg.	HR	RBI
C	Mike Lieberthal	86	313	80	.256	8	45
1B	Rico Brogna	153	565	150	.265	20	104
2B	Mark Lewis	142	518	129	.249	9	54
SS	Desi Relaford	142	494	121	.245	5	41
3B	Scott Rolen	160	601	174	.290	31	110
LF	Gregg Jeffries	125	483	142	.294	8	48
CF	Doug Glanville	158	678	189	.279	8	49
RF	Bobby Abreu	151	497	155	.312	17	74

==== Other batters ====
Note: G = Games played; AB = At bats; H = Hits; Avg. = Batting average; HR = Home runs; RBI = Runs batted in

Player	G	AB	H	Avg.	HR	RBI
Kevin Jordan	112	250	69	.276	2	27
Kevin Sefcik	104	169	53	.314	3	20
Bobby Estalella	47	165	31	.188	8	20
Alex Arias	56	133	39	.293	1	16
Mark Parent	34	113	25	.221	1	13
Rubén Amaro Jr.	92	107	20	.187	1	10
Wendell Magee	20	75	22	.293	1	11
Jon Zuber	38	45	11	.244	2	6
Marlon Anderson	17	43	14	.326	1	4
Rex Hudler	25	41	5	.122	0	2
Gary Bennett	9	31	9	.290	0	3

=== Pitching ===
==== Starting pitchers ====
Note: G = Games pitched; IP = Innings pitched; W = Wins; L = Losses; ERA = Earned run average; SO = Strikeouts

Player	G	IP	W	L	ERA	SO
Curt Schilling	35	268.2	15	14	3.25	300
Mark Portugal	26	166.1	10	5	4.44	104
Tyler Green	27	159.1	6	12	5.03	113
Carlton Loewer	21	122.2	7	8	6.09	58
Matt Beech	21	117.0	3	9	5.15	113
Paul Byrd	8	55.0	5	2	2.29	38
Garrett Stephenson	6	23.0	0	2	9.00	17

==== Other pitchers ====
Note: G = Games pitched; IP = Innings pitched; W = Wins; L = Losses; ERA = Earned run average; SO = Strikeouts

Player	G	IP	W	L	ERA	SO
Mike Grace	21	90.1	4	7	5.48	46
Mike Welch	10	20.2	0	2	8.27	15

==== Relief pitchers ====
Note: G = Games pitched; W = Wins; L = Losses; SV = Saves; ERA = Earned run average; SO = Strikeouts

Player	G	W	L	SV	ERA	SO
Mark Leiter	69	7	5	23	3.55	84
Wayne Gomes	71	9	6	1	4.24	86
Jerry Spradlin	69	4	4	1	3.53	76
Yorkis Pérez	57	0	2	0	3.81	42
Ricky Bottalico	39	1	5	6	6.44	27
Darrin Winston	27	2	2	1	6.12	11
Ken Ryan	17	0	0	0	4.37	16
Matt Whiteside	10	1	1	0	8.50	14
Toby Borland	6	0	0	0	5.00	9
Robert Dodd	4	1	0	0	7.20	4
Billy Brewer	2	0	1	0	108.00	0
Ryan Nye	1	0	0	0	27.00	3

== 1998 Game Log ==
Legend
	Phillies win
	Phillies loss
	Postponement
**Bold**	Phillies team member

1998 Game Log
Overall Record: 75–87
March (0–1)

#	Date	Opponent	Score	Win	Loss	Save	Attendance	Record
1	March 31	@ Mets	0–1 (14)	Turk Wendell (1–0)	**Ricky Bottalico** (0–1)	None	49,142	0–1

April (12–12)

#	Date	Opponent	Score	Win	Loss	Save	Attendance	Record
2	April 2	@ Mets	6–5	**Mark Portugal** (1–0)	Al Leiter (0–1)	**Ricky Bottalico** (1)	13,591	1–1
3	April 3	@ Braves	1–5	Denny Neagle (1–0)	**Mike Grace** (0–1)	None	30,020	1–2
4	April 4	@ Braves	4–5	Dennis Martínez (1–0)	**Billy Brewer** (0–1)	Mark Wohlers (1)	39,154	1–3
5	April 5	@ Braves	2–1	**Curt Schilling** (1–0)	Greg Maddux (0–1)	None	35,331	2–3
6	April 7	Marlins	9–8 (10)	**Ricky Bottalico** (1–1)	Jesús Sánchez (0–1)	None	41,158	3–3
7	April 8	Marlins	9–5	**Mike Grace** (1–1)	Eric Ludwick (0–2)	None	11,769	4–3
–	April 9	Marlins	Postponed (rain); Makeup: July 24 as a traditional double-header					
8	April 10	Braves	1–0	**Curt Schilling** (2–0)	Mike Cather (0–1)	None	30,311	5–3
9	April 11	Braves	6–5	**Tyler Green** (1–0)	Dennis Martínez (1–1)	None	17,676	6–3
10	April 12	Braves	2–3	Tom Glavine (2–0)	**Garrett Stephenson** (0–1)	Mark Wohlers (3)	18,760	6–4
11	April 13	Braves	11–8	**Jerry Spradlin** (1–0)	Kerry Ligtenberg (1–1)	**Ricky Bottalico** (2)	15,101	7–4
–	April 14	@ Marlins	Postponed (rain); Makeup: September 26 as a traditional double-header					
12	April 15	@ Marlins	2–3	Brian Meadows (1–2)	**Curt Schilling** (2–1)	Félix Heredia (1)	23,008	7–5
13	April 16	@ Marlins	4–12	Liván Hernández (2–1)	**Tyler Green** (1–1)	None	16,708	7–6
14	April 17	@ Cardinals	5–8	Cliff Politte (2–0)	**Matt Whiteside** (0–1)	Kent Bottenfield (3)	33,995	7–7
15	April 18	@ Cardinals	5–6	Manny Aybar (2–2)	**Mike Grace** (1–2)	Jeff Brantley (3)	38,848	7–8
16	April 19	@ Cardinals	2–3	Kent Mercker (2–0)	**Matt Beech** (0–1)	Juan Acevedo (1)	36,819	7–9
17	April 21	Reds	3–6	Brett Tomko (3–1)	**Curt Schilling** (2–2)	Jeff Shaw (6)	13,452	7–10
18	April 22	Reds	5–4	**Tyler Green** (2–1)	Gabe White (0–3)	**Ricky Bottalico** (3)	11,102	8–10
19	April 23	Reds	6–3	**Jerry Spradlin** (2–0)	Scott Sullivan (0–2)	**Mark Leiter** (1)	10,445	9–10
20	April 24	Cardinals	8–4	**Matt Whiteside** (1–1)	Kent Mercker (2–1)	None	15,208	10–10
21	April 25	Cardinals	5–8	Mark Petkovsek (1–0)	**Jerry Spradlin** (2–1)	Jeff Brantley (5)	22,777	10–11
22	April 26	Cardinals	9–3	**Curt Schilling** (3–2)	Todd Stottlemyre (3–1)	None	27,917	11–11
23	April 27	@ Reds	1–3	Stan Belinda (1–2)	**Tyler Green** (2–2)	None	13,889	11–12
24	April 28	@ Reds	11–8 (10)	**Mark Leiter** (1–0)	Stan Belinda (1–3)	**Darrin Winston** (1)	15,890	12–12
25	April 29	@ Reds	0–1	Pete Harnisch (2–0)	**Mike Grace** (1–3)	None	16,411	12–13

May (13–15)

#	Date	Opponent	Score	Win	Loss	Save	Attendance	Record
26	May 1	Astros	5–12	Shane Reynolds (2–2)	**Matt Beech** (0–2)	None	11,410	12–14
27	May 2	Astros	1–4	Mike Hampton (5–0)	**Curt Schilling** (3–3)	Billy Wagner (7)	18,766	12–15
28	May 3	Astros	5–3	**Wayne Gomes** (1–0)	Sean Bergman (2–2)	**Mark Leiter** (2)	21,288	13–15
29	May 4	Rockies	2–11	John Thomson (2–2)	**Garrett Stephenson** (0–2)	None	11,403	13–16
30	May 5	Rockies	1–6	Darryl Kile (4–3)	**Mike Grace** (1–4)	None	13,672	13–17
31	May 6	Rockies	7–6 (10)	**Mark Leiter** (2–0)	Chuck McElroy (0–1)	None	19,538	14–17
32	May 7	Diamondbacks	4–1	**Curt Schilling** (4–3)	Andy Benes (2–3)	**Mark Leiter** (3)	13,838	15–17
33	May 8	Diamondbacks	6–4	**Tyler Green** (3–2)	Gregg Olson (1–2)	**Mark Leiter** (4)	13,259	16–17
–	May 9	Diamondbacks	Postponed (rain); Makeup: August 20 as a traditional double-header					
34	May 10	Diamondbacks	7–4	**Darrin Winston** (1–0)	Jeff Suppan (0–4)	**Mark Leiter** (5)	18,520	17–17
35	May 11	@ Dodgers	5–2	**Matt Beech** (1–2)	Darren Dreifort (0–4)	**Mark Leiter** (6)	25,992	18–17
36	May 12	@ Dodgers	5–3	**Curt Schilling** (5–3)	Scott Radinsky (1–1)	**Mark Leiter** (7)	32,382	19–17
37	May 13	@ Dodgers	4–9	Chan Ho Park (4–1)	**Tyler Green** (3–3)	None	28,604	19–18
38	May 14	@ Dodgers	4–0	**Mark Portugal** (2–0)	Hideo Nomo (2–5)	None	30,867	20–18
39	May 15	@ Padres	6–7	Brian Boehringer (5–1)	**Mike Grace** (1–5)	Trevor Hoffman (12)	25,157	20–19
40	May 16	@ Padres	2–3	Carlos Reyes (2–1)	**Mark Leiter** (2–1)	None	53,117	20–20
41	May 17	@ Padres	1–3	Donne Wall (1–1)	**Curt Schilling** (5–4)	Trevor Hoffman (13)	27,913	20–21
42	May 19	Cardinals	8–10	John Frascatore (1–2)	**Wayne Gomes** (1–1)	Juan Acevedo (2)	16,541	20–22
43	May 20	Cardinals	5–8	Mike Busby (5–0)	**Mark Portugal** (2–1)	Jeff Brantley (7)	21,347	20–23
44	May 21	Cardinals	4–3	**Mike Grace** (2–5)	Todd Stottlemyre (5–4)	**Mark Leiter** (8)	22,706	21–23
45	May 22	@ Expos	7–5 (10)	**Wayne Gomes** (2–1)	Anthony Telford (2–2)	**Mark Leiter** (9)	11,588	22–23
46	May 23	@ Expos	2–3	Ugueth Urbina (3–1)	**Curt Schilling** (5–5)	None	15,663	22–24
47	May 24	@ Expos	4–5	Carlos Pérez (4–3)	**Jerry Spradlin** (2–2)	Ugueth Urbina (11)	14,164	22–25
48	May 25	@ Expos	5–3 (14)	**Wayne Gomes** (3–1)	Shayne Bennett (1–3)	**Jerry Spradlin** (1)	9,621	23–25
49	May 27	@ Cubs	10–5	**Mike Grace** (3–5)	Geremi González (3–5)	None	19,354	24–25
50	May 28	@ Cubs	8–7	**Darrin Winston** (2–0)	Rod Beck (1–1)	**Mark Leiter** (10)	25,285	25–25
51	May 29	Mets	0–11	Rick Reed (6–2)	**Matt Beech** (1–3)	None	21,567	25–26
52	May 30	Mets	4–6	Al Leiter (5–3)	**Tyler Green** (3–4)	John Franco (11)	30,660	25–27
53	May 31	Mets	6–8	Mel Rojas (3–0)	**Darrin Winston** (2–1)	John Franco (12)	23,025	25–28

June (15–12)

#	Date	Opponent	Score	Win	Loss	Save	Attendance	Record
54	June 1	Expos	6–2	**Wayne Gomes** (4–1)	Mike Maddux (1–2)	None	16,704	26–28
55	June 2	Expos	3–4	Carl Pavano (1–0)	**Curt Schilling** (5–6)	Ugueth Urbina (13)	13,606	26–29
56	June 3	Expos	2–3	Carlos Pérez (6–3)	**Wayne Gomes** (4–2)	None	13,592	26–30
57	June 5	@ Blue Jays	8–7	**Tyler Green** (4–4)	Bill Risley (0–3)	**Mark Leiter** (11)	31,176	27–30
58	June 6	@ Blue Jays	10–6	**Wayne Gomes** (5–2)	Juan Guzmán (3–7)	None	30,102	28–30
59	June 7	@ Blue Jays	1–3	Chris Carpenter (2–2)	**Curt Schilling** (5–7)	Randy Myers (15)	26,236	28–31
60	June 8	Orioles	8–14	Arthur Rhodes (3–2)	**Darrin Winston** (2–2)	Jesse Orosco (4)	26,742	28–32
61	June 9	Orioles	2–0	**Matt Beech** (2–3)	Sidney Ponson (0–4)	**Mark Leiter** (12)	27,602	29–32
62	June 10	Orioles	2–5 (10)	Armando Benítez (2–1)	**Mark Leiter** (2–2)	None	27,326	29–33
63	June 12	Cubs	4–0	**Curt Schilling** (6–7)	Kevin Tapani (8–4)	None	15,489	30–33
64	June 13	Cubs	8–10 (10)	Terry Adams (5–3)	**Jerry Spradlin** (2–3)	None	17,115	30–34
65	June 14	Cubs	4–2	**Carlton Loewer** (1–0)	Mark Clark (4–7)	None	25,543	31–34
66	June 15	Pirates	2–1	**Matt Beech** (3–3)	Jon Lieber (4–8)	**Mark Leiter** (13)	14,411	32–34
67	June 16	Pirates	8–7	**Robert Dodd** (1–0)	Rich Loiselle (1–5)	None	24,615	33–34
68	June 17	Pirates	3–1	**Curt Schilling** (7–7)	Francisco Córdova (6–5)	None	25,694	34–34
69	June 18	@ Cubs	5–12	Geremi González (6–5)	**Mark Portugal** (2–2)	Terry Mulholland (2)	21,267	34–35
70	June 19	@ Cubs	9–8 (12)	**Jerry Spradlin** (3–3)	Terry Mulholland (2–2)	None	39,592	35–35
71	June 20	@ Cubs	4–9	Kerry Wood (7–3)	**Matt Beech** (3–4)	None	39,761	35–36
72	June 21	@ Cubs	7–2	**Tyler Green** (5–4)	Steve Trachsel (6–4)	None	38,437	36–36
73	June 22	@ Red Sox	9–8 (10)	**Wayne Gomes** (6–2)	Tom Gordon (4–2)	**Mark Leiter** (14)	33,592	37–36
74	June 23	@ Red Sox	3–2	**Mark Portugal** (3–2)	Derek Lowe (0–6)	None	33,212	38–36
75	June 24	Red Sox	11–8	**Carlton Loewer** (2–0)	Steve Avery (4–2)	**Mark Leiter** (15)	28,079	39–36
76	June 25	Red Sox	5–7	Bret Saberhagen (9–5)	**Matt Beech** (3–5)	Ron Mahay (1)	28,263	39–37
77	June 26	Devil Rays	7–0	**Tyler Green** (6–4)	Jason Johnson (2–5)	None	17,559	40–37
78	June 27	Devil Rays	1–5	Rolando Arrojo (10–4)	**Curt Schilling** (7–8)	None	44,262	40–38
79	June 28	Devil Rays	4–5	Albie Lopez (4–2)	**Wayne Gomes** (6–3)	Roberto Hernández (17)	25,157	40–39
80	June 30	@ Yankees	2–9	David Cone (11–2)	**Carlton Loewer** (2–1)	None	29,087	40–40

July (15–12)

#	Date	Opponent	Score	Win	Loss	Save	Attendance	Record
81	July 1	@ Yankees	2–5	David Wells (11–2)	**Matt Beech** (3–6)	Mariano Rivera (20)	28,919	40–41
82	July 2	@ Yankees	8–9 (11)	Mike Buddie (3–0)	**Jerry Spradlin** (3–4)	None	31,259	40–42
83	July 3	Brewers	2–0	**Curt Schilling** (8–8)	Scott Karl (6–4)	**Mark Leiter** (16)	55,393	41–42
84	July 4	Brewers	6–5	**Wayne Gomes** (7–3)	Bob Wickman (3–5)	None	35,596	42–42
85	July 5	Brewers	4–3	**Carlton Loewer** (3–1)	Cal Eldred (4–6)	**Mark Leiter** (17)	20,116	43–42
–	July 7	**1998 Major League Baseball All-Star Game at Coors Field in Denver**						
86	July 10	@ Pirates	7–6	**Curt Schilling** (9–8)	Francisco Córdova (6–8)	None	18,665	44–42
87	July 11	@ Pirates	1–0	**Mark Portugal** (4–2)	Rich Loiselle (1–7)	**Mark Leiter** (18)	30,084	45–42
88	July 12	@ Pirates	10–4	**Carlton Loewer** (4–1)	Esteban Loaiza (6–5)	None	34,144	46–42
89	July 13	@ Brewers	2–4	Steve Woodard (6–5)	**Tyler Green** (6–5)	Bob Wickman (13)	17,230	46–43
90	July 14	@ Brewers	4–2	**Wayne Gomes** (8–3)	Jeff Juden (7–8)	**Mark Leiter** (19)	16,861	47–43
91	July 15	@ Brewers	2–3	Scott Karl (7–4)	**Curt Schilling** (9–9)	Bob Wickman (14)	20,554	47–44
92	July 16	@ Mets	4–2	**Mark Portugal** (5–2)	Rick Reed (10–6)	**Mark Leiter** (20)	20,283	48–44
93	July 17	@ Mets	0–6	Hideo Nomo (3–8)	**Carlton Loewer** (4–2)	None	23,298	48–45
94	July 18	@ Mets	0–7	Al Leiter (10–4)	**Tyler Green** (6–6)	None	37,208	48–46
95	July 19	@ Mets	7–6 (10)	**Mark Leiter** (3–2)	Dennis Cook (4–3)	None	29,520	49–46
96	July 20	@ Expos	3–1	**Curt Schilling** (10–9)	Carlos Pérez (7–10)	None	9,792	50–46
97	July 21	@ Expos	3–2	**Mark Portugal** (6–2)	Carl Pavano (3–4)	None	10,816	51–46
98	July 22	Braves	2–14	Tom Glavine (14–4)	**Carlton Loewer** (4–3)	None	28,304	51–47
99	July 23	Braves	2–3	Kevin Millwood (11–5)	**Tyler Green** (6–7)	Kerry Ligtenberg (12)	28,222	51–48
100	July 24 (1)	Marlins	6–4 (12)	**Wayne Gomes** (9–3)	Antonio Alfonseca (2–4)	None	see 2nd game	52–48
101	July 24 (2)	Marlins	7–6 (12)	**Mark Leiter** (4–2)	Vic Darensbourg (0–7)	None	30,622	53–48
102	July 25	Marlins	4–5	Liván Hernández (8–7)	**Curt Schilling** (10–10)	Matt Mantei (4)	21,038	53–49
103	July 26	Marlins	10–9	**Mark Leiter** (5–2)	Antonio Alfonseca (2–5)	None	27,944	54–49
104	July 28	Dodgers	3–7	Brian Bohanon (4–6)	**Tyler Green** (6–8)	None	24,828	54–50
105	July 29	Dodgers	8–3	**Carlton Loewer** (5–3)	Dave Mlicki (5–5)	None	20,127	55–50
106	July 30	Dodgers	1–3	Chan Ho Park (10–5)	**Matt Beech** (3–7)	Jeff Shaw (31)	22,890	55–51
107	July 31	Giants	6–7	José Mesa (5–4)	**Yorkis Pérez** (0–1)	Robb Nen (28)	21,763	55–52

August (11–20)

#	Date	Opponent	Score	Win	Loss	Save	Attendance	Record
108	August 1	Giants	7–8 (10)	Robb Nen (7–2)	**Ricky Bottalico** (1–2)	Rich Rodriguez (2)	24,452	55–53
109	August 2	Giants	3–15	Kirk Rueter (12–6)	**Mike Welch** (0–1)	None	27,668	55–54
110	August 3	Giants	1–6	Danny Darwin (7–9)	**Carlton Loewer** (5–4)	None	31,080	55–55
111	August 4	@ Padres	1–3	Sterling Hitchcock (5–4)	**Matt Beech** (3–8)	Trevor Hoffman (37)	22,125	55–56
112	August 5	@ Padres	0–4	Kevin Brown (14–3)	**Curt Schilling** (10–11)	None	19,109	55–57
113	August 6	@ Padres	3–2 (11)	**Mark Leiter** (6–2)	Trevor Hoffman (3–1)	None	19,007	56–57
114	August 7	@ Astros	0–9	Randy Johnson (11–10)	**Mike Welch** (0–2)	None	52,071	56–58
115	August 8	@ Astros	6–7	Doug Henry (8–2)	**Mark Leiter** (6–3)	None	42,523	56–59
116	August 9	@ Astros	2–11	Shane Reynolds (14–7)	**Matt Beech** (3–9)	None	28,651	56–60
117	August 10	@ Diamondbacks	3–0	**Curt Schilling** (11–11)	Omar Daal (5–7)	None	41,711	57–60
118	August 11	@ Diamondbacks	3–7	Andy Benes (10–11)	**Mark Portugal** (6–3)	None	41,298	57–61
119	August 12	@ Diamondbacks	7–4	**Mike Grace** (4–5)	Brian Anderson (8–11)	**Mark Leiter** (21)	41,510	58–61
120	August 14	@ Rockies	6–2	**Carlton Loewer** (6–4)	Bobby M. Jones (5–6)	None	47,395	59–61
121	August 15	@ Rockies	3–7	Darryl Kile (9–14)	**Wayne Gomes** (9–4)	None	48,329	59–62
122	August 16	@ Rockies	8–7	**Mark Portugal** (7–3)	Jamey Wright (7–11)	**Mark Leiter** (22)	48,024	60–62
123	August 17	Astros	4–0	**Paul Byrd** (1–0)	Randy Johnson (12–11)	None	18,975	61–62
124	August 18	Astros	2–8	José Lima (12–6)	**Mike Grace** (4–6)	None	17,541	61–63
125	August 19	Astros	3–4	Shane Reynolds (15–8)	**Mark Leiter** (6–4)	Billy Wagner (24)	21,341	61–64
126	August 20 (1)	Diamondbacks	11–1	**Curt Schilling** (12–11)	Bob Wolcott (1–3)	None	see 2nd game	62–64
127	August 20 (2)	Diamondbacks	9–12 (11)	Alan Embree (4–0)	**Ricky Bottalico** (1–3)	None	26,216	62–65
128	August 21	Diamondbacks	1–0	**Mark Portugal** (8–3)	Omar Daal (6–8)	**Wayne Gomes** (1)	17,144	63–65
129	August 22	Rockies	6–1	**Paul Byrd** (2–0)	Pedro Astacio (11–13)	None	23,435	64–65
130	August 23	Rockies	2–5	John Thomson (8–8)	**Mike Grace** (4–7)	Jerry Dipoto (16)	26,364	64–66
131	August 24	Rockies	1–3	Bobby M. Jones (6–7)	**Carlton Loewer** (6–5)	Dave Veres (5)	15,665	64–67
132	August 25	Padres	3–5	Kevin Brown (17–4)	**Curt Schilling** (12–12)	Trevor Hoffman (42)	18,100	64–68
133	August 26	Padres	0–2	Joey Hamilton (11–11)	**Mark Portugal** (8–4)	Trevor Hoffman (43)	15,656	64–69
134	August 27	Padres	1–8	Stan Spencer (1–0)	**Paul Byrd** (2–1)	None	23,371	64–70
135	August 28	@ Giants	4–3 (10)	**Mark Leiter** (7–4)	Robb Nen (7–5)	None	14,317	65–70
136	August 29	@ Giants	3–10	Mark Gardner (11–5)	**Carlton Loewer** (6–6)	None	30,147	65–71
137	August 30	@ Giants	5–4	**Curt Schilling** (13–12)	Russ Ortiz (2–4)	None	36,920	66–71
138	August 31	@ Giants	2–6	José Mesa (8–6)	**Wayne Gomes** (9–5)	None	13,092	66–72

September (9–15)

#	Date	Opponent	Score	Win	Loss	Save	Attendance	Record
139	September 1	@ Dodgers	2–3	Ismael Valdez (10–9)	**Paul Byrd** (2–2)	Jeff Shaw (39)	28,199	66–73
140	September 2	@ Dodgers	0–6	Carlos Pérez (8–13)	**Tyler Green** (6–9)	None	32,630	66–74
141	September 5	@ Brewers	6–2	**Curt Schilling** (14–12)	Steve Woodard (9–10)	None	17,160	67–74
142	September 6	@ Brewers	2–3 (14)	David Weathers (5–5)	**Ricky Bottalico** (1–4)	None	15,935	67–75
143	September 7	@ Brewers	4–5	David Weathers (6–5)	**Wayne Gomes** (9–6)	None	17,733	67–76
144	September 8	Mets	16–4	**Paul Byrd** (3–2)	Hideo Nomo (6–12)	None	18,661	68–76
145	September 9	Mets	2–6	Armando Reynoso (7–1)	**Curt Schilling** (14–13)	John Franco (34)	16,193	68–77
146	September 10	Mets	5–7	Al Leiter (15–5)	**Tyler Green** (6–10)	John Franco (35)	16,715	68–78
147	September 11	Pirates	1–6	Chris Peters (8–9)	**Carlton Loewer** (6–7)	None	16,597	68–79
148	September 12	Pirates	13–4	**Mark Portugal** (9–4)	Elmer Dessens (2–4)	None	19,329	69–79
149	September 13	Pirates	4–1	**Paul Byrd** (4–2)	Francisco Córdova (12–13)	**Mark Leiter** (23)	19,662	70–79
150	September 14	@ Braves	2–4	Tom Glavine (19–6)	**Curt Schilling** (14–14)	Kerry Ligtenberg (28)	33,367	70–80
151	September 15	@ Braves	0–3	Kevin Millwood (16–8)	**Tyler Green** (6–11)	Norm Charlton (1)	35,478	70–81
152	September 16	@ Braves	1–5	John Smoltz (16–3)	**Carlton Loewer** (6–8)	None	34,961	70–82
153	September 18	Expos	4–11	Javier Vázquez (5–14)	**Mark Portugal** (9–5)	Anthony Telford (1)	14,811	70–83
154	September 19	Expos	4–3	**Curt Schilling** (15–14)	Mike Maddux (3–4)	None	18,701	71–83
155	September 20	Expos	6–3	**Paul Byrd** (5–2)	Dustin Hermanson (14–11)	**Ricky Bottalico** (4)	26,207	72–83
156	September 21	@ Reds	5–8	Scott Sullivan (5–5)	**Mark Leiter** (7–5)	Danny Graves (7)	12,969	72–84
157	September 22	@ Reds	10–8 (11)	**Jerry Spradlin** (4–4)	Todd Williams (0–1)	**Ricky Bottalico** (5)	13,644	73–84
158	September 23	@ Reds	4–2	**Mark Portugal** (10–5)	Steve Parris (6–5)	**Ricky Bottalico** (6)	13,376	74–84
–	September 25	@ Marlins	Postponed (rain); Makeup: September 27 as a traditional double-header					
159	September 26 (1)	@ Marlins	3–4 (10)	Antonio Alfonseca (4–6)	**Yorkis Pérez** (0–2)	None	see 2nd game	74–85
160	September 26 (2)	@ Marlins	0–1 (13)	Rob Stanifer (2–4)	**Ricky Bottalico** (1–5)	None	36,267	74–86
161	September 27 (1)	@ Marlins	5–6	Brian Meadows (11–13)	**Tyler Green** (6–12)	Antonio Alfonseca (8)	see 2nd game	74–87
162	September 27 (2)	@ Marlins	7–3	**Carlton Loewer** (7–8)	Rafael Medina (2–6)	None	37,007	75–87

== Farm system ==
Level	Team	League	Manager
AAA	Scranton/Wilkes-Barre; Red Barons	International League	Marc Bombard
AA	Reading Phillies	Eastern League	Al LeBoeuf
A	Clearwater Phillies	Florida State League	Bill Dancy
A	Piedmont Boll Weevils	South Atlantic League	Ken Oberkfell
A-Short Season	Batavia Muckdogs	New York–Penn League	Frank Klebe
Rookie	Martinsville Phillies	Appalachian League	Greg Legg
