= 1998 Atlanta Braves season =

Major League Baseball season

1998 Atlanta Braves
- National League East champions
- League: National League
- Division: East
- Ballpark: Turner Field
- City: Atlanta
- Record: 106–56 (.654)
- Divisional place: 1st
- Owners: Time Warner
- General managers: John Schuerholz
- Managers: Bobby Cox
- Television: WTBS; TBS Superstation (Pete Van Wieren, Skip Caray, Don Sutton, Joe Simpson); Fox Sports South (Ernie Johnson, Bob Rathbun)
- Radio: WSB (AM) (Pete Van Wieren, Skip Caray, Don Sutton, Joe Simpson)

The 1998 Atlanta Braves season marked the franchise's 33rd season in Atlanta and 128th overall. The Braves entered the season as defending National League runner ups. They went on to win their fourth consecutive division title, taking the National League East title by 18 games over the second place New York Mets.

The team featured six all stars: shortstop Walt Weiss and third baseman Chipper Jones were voted as starters, while first baseman Andrés Galarraga, catcher Javy López, and pitchers Tom Glavine and Greg Maddux were selected as reserves. Jones and Lopez each hit over 30 home runs as Galarraga (acquired from Colorado) led the club in home runs and RBI. Galarraga finished as an MVP candidate.

The 1998 Braves beat the Chicago Cubs three games to none in the National League Division Series. In the next round Atlanta then lost to the San Diego Padres in the National League Championship Series four games to two. Despite winning two games after losing the first three, Atlanta's comeback bid came short by being eliminated in Game 6. San Diego's winning over Atlanta was seen as one of the biggest upsets in postseason history. The Braves failed to go to their fifth World Series of the 1990s.

The 1998 Atlanta Braves are seen as one of the greatest Major League Baseball teams of all time, despite not winning a title. ESPN writer David Schoenfield lists them as one of the top teams in MLB history to not win a World Series. The team's greatness and their surprising playoff defeat are memorialized by Morgan Wallen in his 2023 hit, "98 Braves." The song is an extended metaphor that compares a past relationship to the season.

ESPN columnist Jeff Merron also writes that the pitching staff of Maddux, Glavine, John Smoltz, Denny Neagle, and Kevin Millwood was the greatest of all time. The quintet posted a cumulative 2.97 ERA and amassed 88 wins (almost 18 wins per starter), equaling the win total of the 2nd place Mets. The 1998 Braves are the only team in MLB history to have five pitchers each strike out 150 batters in the same season. Glavine, the lone 20 game winner in the National League for that year, won the Cy Young Award.

== Offseason ==
- November 17, 1997: Walt Weiss was signed as a free agent with the Atlanta Braves.
- November 27, 1997: Andrés Galarraga was signed as a free agent with the Atlanta Braves.
- January 30, 1998: Dennis Martínez was signed as a free agent with the Atlanta Braves.
- February 6, 1998: Curtis Pride was signed as a free agent with the Atlanta Braves.

== Regular season ==
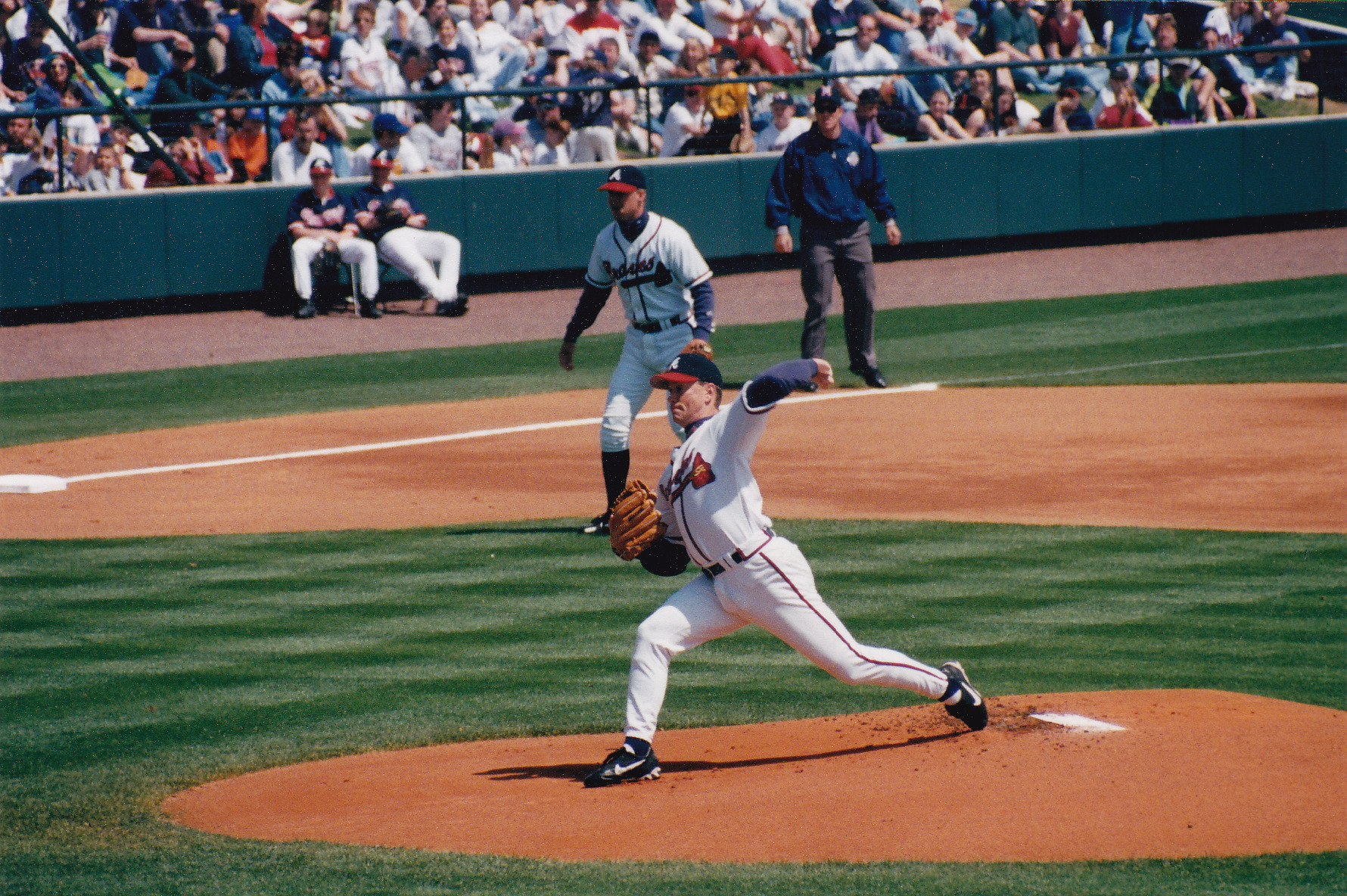
Tom Glavine pitches in spring training, 1998. Chipper Jones plays third base in background.

=== Opening Day starters ===
- C Eddie Pérez
- 1B Andrés Galarraga
- 2B Tony Graffanino
- 3B Chipper Jones
- SS Walt Weiss
- LF Ryan Klesko
- CF Andruw Jones
- RF Michael Tucker
- P Greg Maddux

=== Season standings ===
NL East
Team	W	L	Pct.	GB	Home	Road
Atlanta Braves	106	56	.654	—	56‍–‍25	50‍–‍31
New York Mets	88	74	.543	18	47‍–‍34	41‍–‍40
Philadelphia Phillies	75	87	.463	31	40‍–‍41	35‍–‍46
Montreal Expos	65	97	.401	41	39‍–‍42	26‍–‍55
Florida Marlins	54	108	.333	52	31‍–‍50	23‍–‍58

=== Record vs. opponents ===
1998 National League record Source: MLB Standings Grid – 1998
Team	AZ	ATL	CHC	CIN	COL	FLA	HOU	LAD	MIL	MON	NYM	PHI	PIT	SD	SF	STL	AL
Arizona	—	1–8	5–7	4–5	6–6	6–2	4–5	4–8	6–3	2–7	4–5	2–7	6–3	3–9	5–7	2–7	5–8
Atlanta	8–1	—	3–6	7–2	5–3	7–5	4–5	8–1	7–2	6–6	9–3	8–4	7–2	5–4	7–2	6–3	9–7
Chicago	7–5	6–3	—	6–5	7–2	7–2	4–7	4–5	6–6	7–2	4–5	3–6	8–3	5–4	7–3	4–7	5–8
Cincinnati	5–4	2–7	5–6	—	4–5	9–0	3–8	5–4	6–5	8–1	3–6	4–5	5–7	1–11	2–7	8–3	7-6
Colorado	6–6	3–5	2–7	5–4	—	6–3	6–5	6–6	4–7	7–2	3–6	5–4	5–4	5–7	7–5	3–6	4–8
Florida	2–6	5–7	2–7	0–9	3–6	—	3–6	4–5	0–9	5–7	5–7	6–6	3–6	4–5	0–9	4–5	8–8
Houston	5–4	5–4	7–4	8–3	5–6	6–3	—	3–6	9–2	7–2	5–4	7–2	9–2	5–4	6–3	5–7	10–4
Los Angeles	8–4	1–8	5–4	4–5	6–6	5–4	6–3	—	5–4	5–4	3–5	5–4	7–5	5–7	6–6	4–5	8–5
Milwaukee	3–6	2–7	6–6	5–6	7–4	9–0	2–9	4–5	—	6–3	1–8	4–5	6–5	3–6	5–4	3–8	8–6
Montreal	7–2	6–6	2–7	1–8	2–7	7–5	2–7	4–5	3–6	—	8–4	5–7	2–7	4–4	3–6	3–6	6–10
New York	5–4	3–9	5–4	6–3	6–3	7–5	4–5	5–3	8–1	4–8	—	8–4	4–5	4–5	4–5	6–3	9–7
Philadelphia	7-2	4–8	6–3	5–4	4–5	6–6	2–7	4–5	5–4	7–5	4–8	—	8–1	1–8	2–6	3–6	7–9
Pittsburgh	3–6	2–7	3–8	7–5	4–5	6–3	2–9	5–7	5–6	7–2	5–4	1–8	—	5–4	2–7	6–5	6–7
San Diego	9–3	4–5	4–5	11–1	7–5	5–4	4–5	7–5	6–3	4–4	5–4	8–1	4–5	—	8–4	6–3	6–7
San Francisco	7–5	2–7	3–7	7–2	5–7	9–0	3–6	6–6	4–5	6–3	5–4	6–2	7–2	4–8	—	7–5	8–5
St. Louis	7–2	3–6	7–4	3–8	6–3	5-4	7–5	5–4	8–3	6–3	3–6	6–3	5–6	3–6	5–7	—	4–9

=== Transactions ===
- June 9, 1998: Howard Battle was signed as a free agent with the Atlanta Braves.
- June 23, 1998: Alan Embree was traded by the Atlanta Braves to the Arizona Diamondbacks for Russ Springer.
- August 14, 1998: Paul Byrd was selected off waivers by the Philadelphia Phillies from the Atlanta Braves.

=== Roster ===
1998 Atlanta Braves
**Roster**
**Pitchers**: 50 Adam Butler; 45 Paul Byrd; 38 Mike Cather; 30 Norm Charlton; 48 Bruce Chen; 48 Brian Edmondson; 36 Alan Embree; 47 Tom Glavine; 46 Kerry Ligtenberg; 31 Greg Maddux; 32 Dennis Martínez; 34 Kevin Millwood; 15 Denny Neagle; 45 Odalis Pérez; 49 John Rocker; 40 Rudy Seánez; 29 John Smoltz; 36 Russ Springer; 43 Mark Wohlers	**Catchers**: 8 Javy López; 12 Eddie Pérez; **Infielders**: 2 Rafael Belliard; 23 Greg Colbrunn; 7 Mark DeRosa; 14 Andrés Galarraga; 11 Tony Graffanino; 13 Ozzie Guillén; 9 Wes Helms; 30 Ray Holbert; 10 Chipper Jones; 1 Keith Lockhart; 20 Marty Malloy; 33 Randall Simon; 22 Walt Weiss	**Outfielders**: 17 Danny Bautista; 16 Damon Hollins; 25 Andruw Jones; 18 Ryan Klesko; 26 George Lombard; 19 Curtis Pride; 24 Michael Tucker; 27 Gerald Williams	**Manager**: 6 Bobby Cox; **Coaches**: 37 Jim Beauchamp (bench); 39 Pat Corrales (first base); 22 Bobby Dews; 28 Clarence Jones (hitting); 54 Leo Mazzone (pitching); 5 Ned Yost (bullpen)

=== Game log ===
1998 Game Log: 106–56 (Home: 56–25; Away: 50–31)
March/April: 18–9 (Home: 10–4; Away: 8–5)

#	Date	Opponent	Score	Win	Loss	Save	Attendance	Record
1	March 31	Brewers	2–1	**Ligtenberg** (1–0)	Wickman (0–1)	—	42,891	1–0
2	April 2	Brewers	6–8 (11)	Myers (1–0)	**Butler** (0–1)	—	29,671	1–1
3	April 3	Phillies	5–1	**Neagle** (1–0)	Grace (0–1)	—	30,020	2–1
4	April 4	Phillies	5–4	**Martinez** (1–0)	Brewer (0–1)	**Wohlers** (1)	39,154	3–1
5	April 5	Phillies	1–2	Schilling (1–0)	**Maddux** (0–1)	—	35,331	3–2
6	April 7	@ Pirates	11–3	**Glavine** (1–0)	Schmidt (1–1)	—	43,268	4–2
7	April 8	@ Pirates	3–5	Loaiza (1–0)	**Neagle** (1–1)	Loiselle (3)	11,254	4–3
8	April 9	@ Pirates	4–3	**Millwood** (1–0)	Lieber (0–1)	**Wohlers** (2)	9,560	5–3
9	April 10	@ Phillies	0–1	Schilling (2–0)	**Cather** (0–1)	—	30,311	5–4
10	April 11	@ Phillies	5–6	Green (1–0)	**Martinez** (1–1)	—	17,676	5–5
11	April 12	@ Phillies	3–2	**Glavine** (2–0)	Stephenson (0–1)	**Wohlers** (3)	18,760	6–5
12	April 13	@ Phillies	8–11	Spradlin (1–0)	**Ligtenberg** (1–1)	Bottalico (2)	15,101	6–6
13	April 14	Pirates	6–0	**Millwood** (2–0)	Lieber (0–2)	—	31,259	7–6
14	April 15	Pirates	7–0	**Maddux** (1–1)	Silva (1–2)	—	30,381	8–6
15	April 16	Pirates	3–1	**Smoltz** (1–0)	Cordova (2–1)	**Wohlers** (4)	35,760	9–6
–	April 17	@ Rockies	Postponed (snow); rescheduled for April 19					
16	April 18	@ Rockies	11–4	**Neagle** (2–1)	Astacio (1–3)	—	48,058	10–6
17	April 19 (1)	@ Rockies	5–3	**Millwood** (3–0)	Thompson (1–1)	**Wohlers** (5)	48,038	11–6
18	April 19 (2)	@ Rockies	7–10	Wright (1–2)	**Martinez** (1–2)	Dipoto (4)	43,977	11–7
19	April 20	@ Rockies	7–5	**Maddux** (2–1)	Kile (1–3)	**Ligtenberg** (1)	43,594	12–7
20	April 22	Diamondbacks	5–2	**Smoltz** (2–0)	Benes (2–2)	—	30,952	13–7
21	April 23	Diamondbacks	3–1	**Glavine** (3–0)	Blair (0–4)	**Wohlers** (6)	33,013	14–7
22	April 24	Diamondbacks	6–5	**Ligtenberg** (2–1)	Springer (1–1)	—	41,514	15–7
23	April 25	Rockies	7–11	Kile (2–3)	**Millwood** (3–1)	—	49,161	15–8
24	April 26	Rockies	6–7	Wright (2–2)	**Maddux** (2–2)	Dipoto (5)	42,200	15–9
25	April 27	@ Diamondbacks	6–5	**Cather** (1–1)	Daal (0–1)	**Wohlers** (7)	47,410	16–9
26	April 28	@ Diamondbacks	12–2	**Glavine** (4–0)	Blair (0–5)	—	47,593	17–9
27	April 30	Giants	6–0	**Neagle** (3–1)	Hershiser (0–3)	—	31,818	18–9

May: 21–9 (Home: 15–4; Away: 6–5)

#	Date	Opponent	Score	Win	Loss	Save	Attendance	Record
28	May 1	Giants	6–2	**G. Maddux** (3–2)	Rueter (3–2)	—	35,777	19–9
29	May 2	Giants	4–3	**Ligtenberg** (3–1)	Nen (3–1)	—	46,597	20–9
30	May 3	Giants	8–12	Darwin (2–2)	**Glavine** (4–1)	—	36,958	20–10
31	May 4	Dodgers	4–2	**Millwood** (4–1)	Guthrie (1–1)	**Ligtenberg** (2)	32,330	21–10
32	May 5	Dodgers	8–3	**Neagle** (4–1)	Valdez (2–4)	—	30,310	22–10
33	May 6	Dodgers	7–0	**G. Maddux** (4–2)	Dreifort (0–3)	—	38,637	23–10
34	May 7	Padres	6–3	**Smoltz** (3–0)	Hamilton (3–2)	**Ligtenberg** (3)	31,811	24–10
35	May 8	Padres	2–3	Ashby (5–2)	**Glavine** (4–2)	Hoffman (9)	37,490	24–11
36	May 9	Padres	6–4	**Millwood** (5–1)	Van Ryn (0–1)	**Ligtenberg** (4)	46,160	25–11
37	May 10	Padres	8–5	**Cather** (2–1)	Wall (0–1)	**Ligtenberg** (5)	33,376	26–11
38	May 11	@ Reds	8–1	**G. Maddux** (5–2)	Remlinger (3–4)	—	19,285	27–11
39	May 12	@ Reds	5–1	**Smoltz** (4–0)	Weathers (2–2)	—	19,033	28–11
40	May 13	@ Cardinals	10–2	**Glavine** (5–2)	Politte (2–3)	—	31,532	29–11
41	May 14	@ Cardinals	7–3	**Rocker** (1–0)	Acevedo (1–1)	—	32,119	30–11
42	May 15	@ Astros	3–2	**Neagle** (5–1)	Lima (6–2)	**Martinez** (1)	38,941	31–11
43	May 16	@ Astros	2–3	Henry (2–1)	**Ligtenberg** (3–2)	—	51,526	31–12
44	May 17	@ Astros	1–8	Bergman (4–2)	**Smoltz** (4–1)	—	35,250	31–13
45	May 18	@ Astros	4–0	**Glavine** (6–2)	Hampton (6–2)	—	22,119	32–13
46	May 20	Rockies	5–1	**Millwood** (6–1)	Thomson (2–5)	—	33,531	33–13
47	May 21	Rockies	2–0	**Neagle** (6–1)	Kile (5–5)	**Ligtenberg** (6)	34,611	34–13
48	May 22	Cubs	8–2	**G. Maddux** (6–2)	Clark (3–6)	—	43,576	35–13
49	May 23	Cubs	6–10 (11)	Beck (1–0)	**Edmondson** (0–1)	—	50,189	35–14
50	May 24	Cubs	2–1	**Glavine** (7–2)	Adams (2–3)	—	48,580	36–14
51	May 25	Cubs	9–5	**Millwood** (7–1)	Tapani (6–3)	—	33,704	37–14
52	May 26	Expos	9–3	**Neagle** (7–1)	Batista (1–2)	—	28,662	38–14
53	May 27	Expos	2–0	**G. Maddux** (7–2)	Vazquez (1–6)	**Ligtenberg** (7)	32,834	39–14
54	May 28	Expos	5–9	M. Maddux (1–1)	**Wohlers** (0–1)	—	31,416	39–15
55	May 29	@ Cubs	3–5 (11)	Adams (3–3)	**Rocker** (1–1)	—	38,010	39–16
56	May 30	@ Cubs	8–9	Trachsel (6–1)	**Millwood** (7–2)	Patterson (1)	39,817	39–17
57	May 31	@ Cubs	2–4	Tapani (7–3)	**Neagle** (7–2)	Beck (15)	29,285	39–18

June: 15–11 (Home: 7–7; Away: 8–4)

#	Date	Opponent	Score	Win	Loss	Save	Attendance	Record
58	June 1	@ Brewers	5–2	**Maddux** (8–2)	Woodard (3–3)	—	21,873	40–18
59	June 2	@ Brewers	9–0	**D. Martinez** (2–2)	Wagner (1–4)	—	39,017	41–18
60	June 3	@ Brewers	5–2	**Glavine** (8–2)	Juden (5–4)	**Wohlers** (8)	19,116	42–18
61	June 5	@ Orioles	2–3	Erickson (6–6)	**Neagle** (7–3)	—	48,039	42–19
62	June 6	@ Orioles	10–5	**Millwood** (8–2)	Mussina (4–3)	—	48,098	43–19
63	June 7	@ Orioles	9–0	**Maddux** (9–2)	Drabek (5–6)	—	48,090	44–19
64	June 8	Red Sox	7–6	**Embree** (1–0)	Wasdin (3–3)	—	44,018	45–19
65	June 9	Red Sox	3–9	Saberhagen (8–3)	**D. Martinez** (2–3)	—	43,121	45–20
66	June 10	Red Sox	6–10	P. Martínez (7–2)	**Neagle** (7–4)	—	41,345	45–21
67	June 12	Expos	5–7	Batista (2–3)	**Cather** (2–2)	Urbina (16)	45,942	45–22
68	June 13	Expos	9–7	**Glavine** (9–2)	Johnson (0–2)	**D. Martinez** (2)	48,943	46–22
69	June 14	Expos	5–1	**Millwood** (9–2)	Perez (6–5)	—	46,543	47–22
70	June 16	Marlins	7–0	**Neagle** (8–4)	Fontenot (0–4)	—	39,331	48–22
71	June 17	Marlins	6–2	**Maddux** (10–2)	Sanchez (3–4)	—	38,021	49–22
72	June 18	Marlins	2–3	Ojala (1–0)	**Glavine** (9–3)	Alfonseca (2)	46,296	49–23
73	June 19	@ Expos	1–14	Boskie (1–0)	**Millwood** (9–3)	—	10,364	49–24
74	June 20	@ Expos	5–1	**Smoltz** (5–1)	Perez (6–6)	—	11,139	50–24
75	June 21	@ Expos	1–4	Hermanson (5–6)	**Neagle** (8–5)	Urbina (18)	12,265	50–25
76	June 22	@ Yankees	4–6	Nelson (5–3)	**D. Martinez** (2–4)	Rivera (17)	53,316	50–26
77	June 23	@ Yankees	7–2	**Glavine** (10–3)	Hernandez (2–1)	—	54,775	51–26
78	June 24	Yankees	6–10	Cone (10–2)	**Millwood** (9–4)	Rivera (18)	48,980	51–27
79	June 25	Yankees	0–6	Wells (10–2)	**Neagle** (8–6)	—	49,052	51–28
80	June 26	Blue Jays	4–6	Hentgen (9–4)	**Smoltz** (5–2)	Myers (22)	47,081	51–29
81	June 27	Blue Jays	2–0	**Maddux** (11–2)	Guzman (4–10)	—	48,338	52–29
82	June 28	Blue Jays	10–3	**Glavine** (11–3)	Carpenter (4–3)	—	44,185	53–29
83	June 30	@ Devil Rays	7–2	**Neagle** (9–6)	Saunders (1–9)	—	41,047	54–29

July: 18–9 (Home: 6–4; Away: 12–5)

#	Date	Opponent	Score	Win	Loss	Save	Attendance	Record
84	July 1	@ Devil Rays	6–5	**Springer** (5–3)	R. Hernandez (0–3)	**Ligtenberg** (8)	41,100	55–29
85	July 2	@ Devil Rays	6–0	**Maddux** (12–2)	Arrojo (10–5)	—	40,749	56–29
86	July 3	Mets	3–2	**Glavine** (12–3)	Bohanon (2–4)	**Ligtenberg** (9)	48,757	57–29
87	July 4	Mets	4–1	**Millwood** (10–4)	Yoshii (4–4)	—	47,900	58–29
88	July 5	Mets	3–2 (11)	**Seanez** (1–0)	Franco (0–2)	—	40,430	59–29
**69th All-Star Game in Denver, Colorado**
89	July 9	@ Marlins	6–4	**Smoltz** (6–2)	L. Hernandez (7–5)	**Ligtenberg** (10)	25,535	60–29
90	July 10	@ Marlins	1–3	Sanchez (4–6)	**Neagle** (9–7)	Heredia (2)	26,018	60–30
91	July 11	@ Marlins	3–4	Mantei (3–0)	**Maddux** (12–3)	—	36,795	60–31
92	July 12	@ Marlins	3–5	Meadows (8–6)	**Glavine** (12–4)	Alfonseca (6)	24,956	60–32
93	July 14	@ Mets	4–2	**Smoltz** (7–2)	Jones (7–6)	**Ligtenberg** (11)	38,000	61–32
94	July 15	@ Mets	12–1	**Neagle** (10–7)	Yoshii (4–5)	—	41,347	62–32
95	July 16	Brewers	4–3	**Maddux** (13–3)	Eldred (4–8)	**Seanez** (1)	46,098	63–32
96	July 17	Brewers	4–1	**Glavine** (13–4)	Woodall (4–5)	**Rocker** (1)	48,544	64–32
97	July 18	Brewers	1–7	Woodard (7–5)	**Millwood** (10–5)	—	50,284	64–33
98	July 19	Brewers	11–6	**Smoltz** (8–2)	Juden (7–9)	—	44,598	65–33
99	July 20	Cubs	3–11	Tapani (11–6)	**Neagle** (10–8)	—	47,475	65–34
100	July 21	Cubs	0–3	Wood (9–5)	**Maddux** (13–4)	Beck (27)	47,933	65–35
101	July 22	@ Phillies	14–2	**Glavine** (14–4)	Loewer (4–3)	—	28,304	66–35
102	July 23	@ Phillies	3–2	**Millwood** (11–5)	Green (6–7)	**Ligtenberg** (12)	28,222	67–35
103	July 24	@ Pirates	3–0	**Smoltz** (9–2)	Peters (4–8)	—	24,776	68–35
104	July 25	@ Pirates	1–4	Cordova (9–8)	**Neagle** (10–9)	Christiansen (4)	41,568	68–36
105	July 26	@ Pirates	2–1	**Maddux** (14–4)	Schmidt (8–8)	**Ligtenberg** (13)	34,925	69–36
106	July 27	@ Reds	3–2 (10)	**Seanez** (2–0)	Belinda (4–8)	**Ligtenberg** (14)	23,866	70–36
107	July 28	@ Reds	1–13	Sullivan (3–4)	**Millwood** (11–6)	—	22,690	70–37
108	July 29	@ Reds	11–5	**Seanez** (3–0)	Parris (1–2)	—	24,480	71–37
109	July 30	@ Reds	13–3	**Neagle** (11–9)	Krivda (2–2)	—	28,946	72–37
110	July 31	Cardinals	2–3	Mercker (7–8)	**Maddux** (14–5)	Painter (1)	50,662	72–38

August: 18–10 (Home: 9–4; Away: 9–6)

#	Date	Opponent	Score	Win	Loss	Save	Attendance	Record
111	August 1	Cardinals	3–1	**Seanez** (4–0)	Croushore (0–3)	**Ligtenberg** (15)	50,137	73–38
112	August 2	Cardinals	4–3	**Millwood** (12–6)	Witt (6–7)	**Ligtenberg** (16)	49,296	74–38
113	August 4	Reds	4–2	**Smoltz** (10–2)	Sullivan (3–5)	**Ligtenberg** (17)	43,012	75–38
114	August 5	Reds	9–13	Hudek (4–5)	**Springer** (5–4)	—	43,315	75–39
115	August 6	Reds	5–0	**Maddux** (15–5)	Remlinger (6–12)	—	47,311	76–39
116	August 7	@ Giants	5–0	**Glavine** (15–4)	Rueter (12–7)	—	29,676	77–39
117	August 8	@ Giants	14–6	**Millwood** (13–6)	Darwin (7–10)	—	39,174	78–39
118	August 9	@ Giants	7–5	**Martinez** (3–4)	Mesa (5–6)	**Ligtenberg** (18)	43,957	79–39
119	August 11	@ Padres	1–3	Hamilton (10–9)	**Neagle** (11–10)	Hoffman (39)	31,430	79–40
120	August 12	@ Padres	1–5	Ashby (16–6)	**Maddux** (15–6)	—	40,597	79–41
121	August 13	@ Padres	5–0	**Glavine** (16–4)	Langston (4–5)	—	34,547	80–41
122	August 14	@ Dodgers	5–2	**Millwood** (14–6)	Mlicki (6–6)	**Ligtenberg** (19)	43,560	81–41
123	August 15	@ Dodgers	5–3	**Smoltz** (11–2)	Park (10–7)	**Ligtenberg** (20)	41,240	82–41
124	August 16	@ Dodgers	0–1	Radinsky (5–5)	**Neagle** (11–11)	Shaw (36)	44,471	82–42
125	August 18	Giants	8–4	**Maddux** (16–6)	Rueter (12–9)	—	42,986	83–42
126	August 19	Giants	2–6	Gardner (10–5)	**Glavine** (16–5)	—	44,535	83–43
127	August 20	Padres	0–2	Brown (16–4)	**Millwood** (14–7)	Hoffman (41)	43,730	83–44
128	August 21	Padres	5–4	**Smoltz** (12–2)	Hamilton (10–11)	**Ligtenberg** (21)	48,268	84–44
129	August 22	Dodgers	7–5	**Neagle** (12–11)	Dreifort (6–12)	**Ligtenberg** (22)	48,326	85–44
130	August 23	Dodgers	12–7	**Maddux** (17–6)	Perez (7–13)	—	45,179	86–44
131	August 24	Dodgers	4–3	**Glavine** (17–5)	Shaw (2–6)	**Ligtenberg** (23)	39,449	87–44
132	August 25	@ Astros	2–3	Hampton (10–6)	**Millwood** (14–8)	Wagner (25)	32,157	87–45
133	August 26	@ Astros	6–2	**Smoltz** (13–2)	Bergman (11–7)	—	32,651	88–45
134	August 27	@ Cardinals	6–4	**Neagle** (13–11)	Morris (4–4)	**Ligtenberg** (24)	33,889	89–45
135	August 28	@ Cardinals	4–5 (10)	Acevedo (7–3)	**Martinez** (3–5)	—	45,666	89–46
136	August 29	@ Cardinals	4–3	**Glavine** (18–5)	Bottenfield (4–6)	**Seanez** (2)	47,627	90–46
137	August 30	@ Cardinals	7–8	Petkovsek (7–4)	**Martinez** (3–6)	Acevedo (4)	44,051	90–47
138	August 31	Astros	3–4	Powell (5–5)	**Smoltz** (13–3)	Wagner (26)	33,883	90–48

September: 16–8 (Home: 9–2; Away: 7–6)

#	Date	Opponent	Score	Win	Loss	Save	Attendance	Record
139	September 1	Astros	6–4	**Neagle** (14–11)	Elarton (1–1)	**Ligtenberg** (25)	31,168	91–48
140	September 2	Astros	2–4	Johnson (15–11)	**Maddux** (17–7)	Wagner (27)	46,238	91–49
141	September 4	@ Mets	1–2	Leiter (14–5)	**Glavine** (18–6)	—	34,617	91–50
142	September 5	@ Mets	4–5	Wendell (5–1)	**Seanez** (4–1)	Franco (32)	43,573	91–51
143	September 6	@ Mets	4–0	**Smoltz** (14–3)	Reed (16–9)	—	40,311	92–51
144	September 7	@ Mets	7–8	McMichael (3–4)	**Rocker** (1–2)	Franco (33)	22,953	92–52
145	September 8	@ Expos	3–6	Batista (3–5)	**Maddux** (17–8)	Urbina (29)	7,216	92–53
146	September 9	@ Expos	2–3	Urbina (5–3)	**Rocker** (1–3)	—	7,842	92–54
147	September 10	@ Expos	7–4	**Millwood** (15–8)	Thurman (3–4)	**Ligtenberg** (26)	8,455	93–54
148	September 11	Marlins	8–2	**Smoltz** (15–3)	Ojala (2–5)	—	47,235	94–54
149	September 12	Marlins	4–2	**Chen** (1–0)	Hernandez (10–12)	**Ligtenberg** (27)	48,797	95–54
150	September 13	Marlins	5–6	Sanchez (7–8)	**Perez** (0–1)	Mantei (8)	45,683	95–55
151	September 14	Phillies	4–2	**Glavine** (19–6)	Schilling (14–14)	**Ligtenberg** (28)	33,367	96–55
152	September 15	Phillies	3–0	**Millwood** (16–8)	Green (6–11)	**Charlton** (1)	35,478	97–55
153	September 16	Phillies	5–1	**Smoltz** (16–3)	Loewer (6–8)	—	34,961	98–55
154	September 17	@ Diamondbacks	1–0	**Neagle** (15–11)	Daal (7–12)	**Ligtenberg** (29)	43,251	99–55
155	September 18	@ Diamondbacks	0–5	Benes (14–13)	**Maddux** (17–9)	—	46,434	99–56
156	September 19	@ Diamondbacks	5–0	**Glavine** (20–6)	Anderson (12–13)	—	48,405	100–56
157	September 20	@ Diamondbacks	10–0	**Chen** (2–0)	Telemaco (6–10)	—	44,876	101–56
158	September 22	@ Marlins	4–1	**Millwood** (17–8)	Medina (2–5)	**Ligtenberg** (30)	23,355	102–56
159	September 23	@ Marlins	11–0	**Smoltz** (17–3)	Ojala (2–7)	—	22,469	103–56
160	September 25	Mets	6–5	**Martínez** (4–6)	Reed (16–11)	**Rocker** (2)	48,443	104–56
161	September 26	Mets	4–0	**Neagle** (16–11)	Leiter (17–6)	—	48,117	105–56
162	September 27	Mets	7–2	**Maddux** (18–9)	Reynoso (7–3)	—	48,685	106–56

Legend: = Win = Loss
Bold = Braves team member

== Player stats ==
=== Starters by position ===
Note: Pos = Position; G = Games played; AB = At bats; H = Hits; Avg. = Batting average; HR = Home runs; RBI = Runs batted in

Pos	Player	G	AB	H	Avg.	HR	RBI
C	Javy López	133	489	139	.284	34	107
1B	Andrés Galarraga	153	555	169	.305	44	121
2B	Keith Lockhart	109	366	94	.257	9	37
SS	Walt Weiss	96	347	97	.280	0	27
3B	Chipper Jones	160	601	188	.313	34	107
LF	Ryan Klesko	129	427	117	.274	18	70
CF	Andruw Jones	159	582	158	.271	31	90
RF	Michael Tucker	130	414	101	.244	13	46

==== Other batters ====
Note: G = Games played; AB = At bats; H = Hits; Avg. = Batting average; HR = Home runs; RBI = Runs batted in

Player	G	AB	H	Avg.	HR	RBI
Tony Graffanino	105	289	61	.211	5	22
Gerald Williams	129	266	81	.305	10	44
Ozzie Guillén	83	264	73	.277	1	22
Eddie Pérez	61	149	50	.336	6	32
Danny Bautista	82	144	36	.250	3	17
Curtis Pride	70	107	27	.252	3	9
Greg Colbrunn	28	44	13	.295	1	10
Marty Malloy	11	28	5	.179	1	1
Rafael Belliard	7	20	5	.250	0	1
Randall Simon	7	16	3	.188	0	4
Ray Holbert	8	15	2	.133	0	1
Wes Helms	7	13	4	.308	1	2
Damon Hollins	3	6	1	.167	0	0
George Lombard	6	6	2	.333	1	1
Mark DeRosa	5	3	1	.333	0	0

=== Starting pitchers ===
Note: G = Games pitched; IP = Innings pitched; W = Wins; L = Losses; ERA = Earned run average; SO = Strikeouts

Player	G	IP	W	L	ERA	SO
Greg Maddux	34	251.0	18	9	2.22	204
Tom Glavine	33	229.1	20	6	2.47	157
Denny Neagle	32	210.1	16	11	3.55	165
Kevin Millwood	31	174.1	17	8	4.08	163
John Smoltz	26	167.2	17	3	2.90	173
Bruce Chen	4	20.1	2	0	3.98	17

==== Relief pitchers ====
Note: G = Games pitched; W = Wins; L = Losses; SV = Saves; ERA = Earned run average; SO = Strikeouts

Player	G	W	L	SV	ERA	SO
Kerry Ligtenberg	75	3	2	30	2.71	79
Dennis Martínez	53	4	6	2	4.45	62
John Rocker	47	1	3	2	2.13	42
Mike Cather	36	2	2	0	3.92	33
Rudy Seánez	34	4	1	2	2.75	50
Mark Wohlers	27	0	1	8	10.18	22
Russ Springer	22	1	1	0	4.05	19
Alan Embree	20	1	0	0	4.34	19
Norm Charlton	13	0	0	1	1.38	6
Brian Edmondson	10	0	1	0	4.32	8
Odalis Pérez	10	0	1	0	4.22	5
Adam Butler	8	0	1	0	10.80	7
Paul Byrd	1	0	0	0	13.50!	1

== Postseason ==
=== Game log ===
1998 Postseason Game Log
National League Division Series: 3–0

#	Date	Opponent	Score	Win	Loss	Save	Attendance	Record
1	September 30	Cubs	7–1	Smoltz (1–0)	Clark (0–1)	—	45,598	1–0
2	October 1	Cubs	2–1 (10)	Perez (1–0)	Mulholland (0–1)	—	51,713	2–0
3	October 3	@ Cubs	6–2	Maddux (1–0)	Wood (0–1)	—	39,597	3–0

National League Championship Series: 2–4

#	Date	Opponent	Score	Win	Loss	Save	Attendance	Record
1	October 7	Padres	2–3 (10)	Hoffman (1–0)	Ligtenberg (0–1)	Wall (1)	42,117	0–1
2	October 8	Padres	0–3	Brown (2–0)	Glavine (0–1)	—	43,083	0–2
3	October 10	@ Padres	1–4	Hitchcock (2–0)	Maddux (1–1)	Hoffman (3)	62,799	0–3
4	October 11	@ Padres	8–3	Martínez (1–0)	Hamilton (0–1)	—	65,042	1–3
5	October 12	@ Padres	7–6	Rocker (1–0)	Brown (2–1)	Maddux (1)	58,988	2–3
6	October 14	Padres	0–5	Hitchcock (3–0)	Glavine (0–2)	—	50,988	2–4

== Award winners ==
- Tom Glavine, NL Cy Young Award,
- Tom Glavine, Pitcher of the Month, April
- Tom Glavine, P, Silver Slugger
- Andruw Jones, OF, Gold Glove (Center field)
- Greg Maddux, Pitcher of the Month, June
- Greg Maddux, P, Gold Glove

1998 Major League Baseball All-Star Game

- Chipper Jones, 3B, starter
- Greg Maddux, P, starter
- Walt Weiss, SS, starter
- Andrés Galarraga, 1B, reserve
- Tom Glavine, P, reserve
- Javy López, C, reserve

== Farm system ==
Level	Team	League	Manager
AAA	Richmond Braves	International League	Jeff Cox
AA	Greenville Braves	Southern League	Randy Ingle
A	Danville 97s	Carolina League	Paul Runge
A	Macon Braves	South Atlantic League	Brian Snitker
A-Short Season	Eugene Emeralds	Northwest League	Jim Saul
Rookie	Danville Braves	Appalachian League	Franklin Stubbs
Rookie	GCL Braves	Gulf Coast League	Rick Albert
