= 1998 Milwaukee Brewers season =

30th season in franchise history, first in National League

1998 Milwaukee Brewers
- League: National League
- Division: Central
- Ballpark: Milwaukee County Stadium
- City: Milwaukee, Wisconsin, United States
- Record: 74–88 (.457)
- Divisional place: 5th
- Owners: Bud Selig
- General managers: Sal Bando
- Managers: Phil Garner
- Television: WCGV-TV; Wisconsin Sports Net (Matt Vasgersian, Bill Schroeder)
- Radio: WTMJ (AM) (Bob Uecker, Jim Powell)

The 1998 Milwaukee Brewers season was the 29th season for the Brewers in Milwaukee, their first in the National League, and their 30th overall. The Brewers finished in fifth in the National League Central, 28 games behind the Houston Astros, with a record of 74 wins and 88 losses. Before the 1998 regular season began, two new teams—the Arizona Diamondbacks and Tampa Bay Devil Rays—were added by Major League Baseball. This resulted in the American League and National League having 15 teams. However, in order for MLB officials to continue primarily intraleague play, both leagues would need to carry a number of teams that was divisible by two, so the decision was made to move one club from the AL Central to the NL Central.

This realignment was widely considered to have great financial benefit to the club moving. However, to avoid the appearance of a conflict of interest, Commissioner (then club owner) Bud Selig decided another team should have the first chance to switch leagues. The choice was offered to the Kansas City Royals, who ultimately decided to stay in the American League. The choice then fell to the Brewers, who, on November 6, 1997, elected to move to the National League. Had the Brewers elected not to move to the National League, the Minnesota Twins would have been offered the opportunity to switch leagues. Fernando Vina became the first Brewer named as an National League All-Star.

== Offseason ==
- December 1, 1997: Jack Voigt was released by the Brewers.
- December 8, 1997: Mike Fetters, Ben McDonald, and Ron Villone were traded by the Brewers to the Cleveland Indians for Marquis Grissom and Jeff Juden.
- January 14, 1998: Bob Hamelin was signed as a free agent by the Brewers.
- March 11, 1998: Mark Watson was traded by the Brewers to the Cleveland Indians for Ben McDonald.

== Regular season ==
=== Season standings ===
NL Central
Team	W	L	Pct.	GB	Home	Road
Houston Astros	102	60	.630	—	55‍–‍26	47‍–‍34
Chicago Cubs	90	73	.552	12½	51‍–‍31	39‍–‍42
St. Louis Cardinals	83	79	.512	19	48‍–‍34	35‍–‍45
Cincinnati Reds	77	85	.475	25	39‍–‍42	38‍–‍43
Milwaukee Brewers	74	88	.457	28	38‍–‍43	36‍–‍45
Pittsburgh Pirates	69	93	.426	33	40‍–‍40	29‍–‍53

=== Record vs. opponents ===
1998 National League record Source: MLB Standings Grid – 1998
Team	AZ	ATL	CHC	CIN	COL	FLA	HOU	LAD	MIL	MON	NYM	PHI	PIT	SD	SF	STL	AL
Arizona	—	1–8	5–7	4–5	6–6	6–2	4–5	4–8	6–3	2–7	4–5	2–7	6–3	3–9	5–7	2–7	5–8
Atlanta	8–1	—	3–6	7–2	5–3	7–5	4–5	8–1	7–2	6–6	9–3	8–4	7–2	5–4	7–2	6–3	9–7
Chicago	7–5	6–3	—	6–5	7–2	7–2	4–7	4–5	6–6	7–2	4–5	3–6	8–3	5–4	7–3	4–7	5–8
Cincinnati	5–4	2–7	5–6	—	4–5	9–0	3–8	5–4	6–5	8–1	3–6	4–5	5–7	1–11	2–7	8–3	7-6
Colorado	6–6	3–5	2–7	5–4	—	6–3	6–5	6–6	4–7	7–2	3–6	5–4	5–4	5–7	7–5	3–6	4–8
Florida	2–6	5–7	2–7	0–9	3–6	—	3–6	4–5	0–9	5–7	5–7	6–6	3–6	4–5	0–9	4–5	8–8
Houston	5–4	5–4	7–4	8–3	5–6	6–3	—	3–6	9–2	7–2	5–4	7–2	9–2	5–4	6–3	5–7	10–4
Los Angeles	8–4	1–8	5–4	4–5	6–6	5–4	6–3	—	5–4	5–4	3–5	5–4	7–5	5–7	6–6	4–5	8–5
Milwaukee	3–6	2–7	6–6	5–6	7–4	9–0	2–9	4–5	—	6–3	1–8	4–5	6–5	3–6	5–4	3–8	8–6
Montreal	7–2	6–6	2–7	1–8	2–7	7–5	2–7	4–5	3–6	—	8–4	5–7	2–7	4–4	3–6	3–6	6–10
New York	5–4	3–9	5–4	6–3	6–3	7–5	4–5	5–3	8–1	4–8	—	8–4	4–5	4–5	4–5	6–3	9–7
Philadelphia	7-2	4–8	6–3	5–4	4–5	6–6	2–7	4–5	5–4	7–5	4–8	—	8–1	1–8	2–6	3–6	7–9
Pittsburgh	3–6	2–7	3–8	7–5	4–5	6–3	2–9	5–7	5–6	7–2	5–4	1–8	—	5–4	2–7	6–5	6–7
San Diego	9–3	4–5	4–5	11–1	7–5	5–4	4–5	7–5	6–3	4–4	5–4	8–1	4–5	—	8–4	6–3	6–7
San Francisco	7–5	2–7	3–7	7–2	5–7	9–0	3–6	6–6	4–5	6–3	5–4	6–2	7–2	4–8	—	7–5	8–5
St. Louis	7–2	3–6	7–4	3–8	6–3	5-4	7–5	5–4	8–3	6–3	3–6	6–3	5–6	3–6	5–7	—	4–9

=== Notable transactions ===
- June 2, 1998: J. J. Putz was drafted by the Brewers in the 17th round of the 1998 Major League Baseball draft, but did not sign.
- June 24, 1998: Dave Weathers was selected off waivers by the Milwaukee Brewers from the Cincinnati Reds.
- July 23, 1998: Doug Jones was traded by the Brewers to the Cleveland Indians for Eric Plunk.
- July 31, 1998: Mike Kinkade was traded by the Brewers to the New York Mets for Bill Pulsipher.
- August 7, 1998: Jeff Juden was selected off waivers from the Brewers by the Anaheim Angels.

=== Roster ===
1998 Milwaukee Brewers
Roster
Pitchers: 52 Bobby Chouinard; 58 Valerio de los Santos; 21 Cal Eldred; 40 Chad Fox; 53 Rod Henderson; 43 Joe Hudson; 43 Doug Jones; 14 Jeff Juden; 42 Scott Karl; 41 José Mercedes; 57 Greg Mullins; 28 Mike Myers; 31 Bronswell Patrick; 39 Eric Plunk; 46 Bill Pulsipher; 47 Al Reyes; 52 Rafael Roque; 89 Travis Smith; 46 Paul Wagner; 49 David Weathers; 27 Bob Wickman; 48 Brad Woodall; 37 Steve Woodard	Catchers: 25 Brian Banks; 33 Bobby Hughes; 23 Marcus Jensen; 16 Jesse Levis; 22 Mike Matheny; Infielders: 11 Ronnie Belliard; 26 Jeff Cirillo; 30 Bob Hamelin; 32 John Jaha; 8 Mark Loretta; 7 Dave Nilsson; 2 José Valentín; 1 Fernando Viña	Outfielders: 20 Jeromy Burnitz; 9 Marquis Grissom; 24 Darrin Jackson; 5 Geoff Jenkins; 50 Greg Martinez; 10 Marc Newfield; 39 Eric Owens	Manager: 3 Phil Garner; Coaches: 12 Chris Bando (Bench); 35 Bill Castro (Bullpen); 23 Lamar Johnson (Hitting); 29 Jim Lefebvre (Hitting); 38 Doug Mansolino (First Base), (Third Base); 45 Don Rowe (Pitching); 36 Joel Youngblood (First Base), (Third Base)

== Player stats ==
= Indicates team leader

=== Batting ===
==== Starters by position ====
Note: Pos = Position; G = Games played; AB = At bats; R = Runs; H = Hits; Avg. = Batting average; HR = Home runs; RBI = Runs batted in; SB = Stolen bases

Pos	Player	G	AB	R	H	Avg.	HR	RBI	SB
C	Mike Matheny	108	320	24	76	.238	6	27	1
1B	John Jaha	73	216	29	45	.208	7	38	1
2B	Fernando Viña	159	637	101	198	.311	7	45	22
3B	Jeff Cirillo	156	604	97	194	.321	14	68	10
SS	José Valentín	151	428	65	96	.224	16	49	10
LF	Geoff Jenkins	84	262	33	60	.229	9	28	1
CF	Marquis Grissom	142	542	57	147	.271	10	60	13
RF	Jeromy Burnitz	161	609	92	160	.263	38	125	7

==== Other batters ====
Note: G = Games played; AB = At bats; R = Runs; H = Hits; HR = Home runs; RBI = Runs batted in; Avg. = Batting average; SB = Stolen bases

Player	G	AB	R	H	HR	RBI	Avg.	SB
Mark Loretta	140	434	55	137	6	54	.316	9
Dave Nilsson	102	309	39	83	12	56	.269	2
Bobby Hughes	85	218	28	50	9	29	.229	1
Darrin Jackson	114	204	20	49	4	20	.240	1
Marc Newfield	93	186	15	44	3	25	.237	0
Bob Hamelin	109	146	15	32	7	22	.219	0
Eric Owens	34	40	5	5	1	4	.125	0
Jesse Levis	22	37	4	13	0	4	.351	1
Brian Banks	24	24	3	7	1	5	.292	0
Ronnie Belliard	8	5	1	1	0	0	.200	0
Greg Martinez	13	3	2	0	0	0	.000	2
Marcus Jensen	2	2	0	0	0	0	.000	0

=== Pitching ===
==== Starting pitchers ====
Note: G = Games pitched; IP = Innings pitched; W = Wins; L = Losses; ERA = Earned run average; SO = Strikeouts

Player	G	IP	W	L	ERA	SO
Scott Karl	33	192.1	10	11	4.40	102
Steve Woodard	34	165.2	10	12	4.18	135
Jeff Juden	24	138.1	7	11	5.53	109
Cal Eldred	23	133.0	4	8	4.80	86
Bill Pulsipher	11	58.0	3	4	4.66	38
Rafael Roque	9	48.0	4	2	4.88	34

==== Other pitchers ====
Note: G = Games pitched; IP = Innings pitched; W = Wins; L = Losses; ERA = Earned run average; SO = Strikeouts

Player	G	IP	W	L	ERA	SO
Brad Woodall	31	138.0	7	9	4.96	85
Paul Wagner	13	55.2	1	5	7.11	37
José Mercedes	7	32.0	2	2	6.75	11

==== Relief pitchers ====
Note: G = Games pitched; IP = Innings pitched; W = Wins; L = Losses; SV = Saves; ERA = Earned run average; SO = Strikeouts

Player	G	IP	W	L	SV	ERA	SO
Bob Wickman	72	82.1	6	9	25	3.72	71
Mike Myers	70	50.0	2	2	1	2.70	40
Al Reyes	50	57.0	5	1	0	3.95	58
Chad Fox	49	57.0	1	4	0	3.95	64
Doug Jones	46	54.0	3	4	12	5.17	43
Bronswell Patrick	32	78.2	4	1	0	4.69	49
David Weathers	28	47.2	4	1	0	3.21	43
Eric Plunk	26	31.2	1	2	1	3.69	36
Valerio De Los Santos	13	21.2	0	0	0	2.91	18
Rod Henderson	2	3.2	0	0	0	9.82	1
Greg Mullins	2	1.0	0	0	0	0.00	1
Bobby Chouinard	1	3.0	0	0	0	3.00	1
Travis Smith	1	2.0	0	0	0	0.00	1
Joe Hudson	1	0.1	0	0	0	162.00	0

== Farm system ==
The Brewers' farm system consisted of eight minor league affiliates in 1998. The Brewers operated a Venezuelan Summer League team as a co-op with the Florida Marlins and San Francisco Giants. VSL Guacara 1 won the Venezuelan Summer League championship.

Level	Team	League	Manager
Triple-A	Louisville Redbirds	International League	Gary Allenson
Double-A	El Paso Diablos	Texas League	Ed Romero
Class A-Advanced	Stockton Ports	California League	Bernie Moncallo
Class A	Beloit Snappers	Midwest League	Don Money
Rookie	Helena Brewers	Pioneer League	Tom Houk
Rookie	Ogden Raptors	Pioneer League	Ed Sedar
Rookie	DSL Brewers	Dominican Summer League	—
Rookie	VSL Guacara 1	Venezuelan Summer League	—
