= Héctor Mercado =

Puerto Rican baseball player (born 1974)

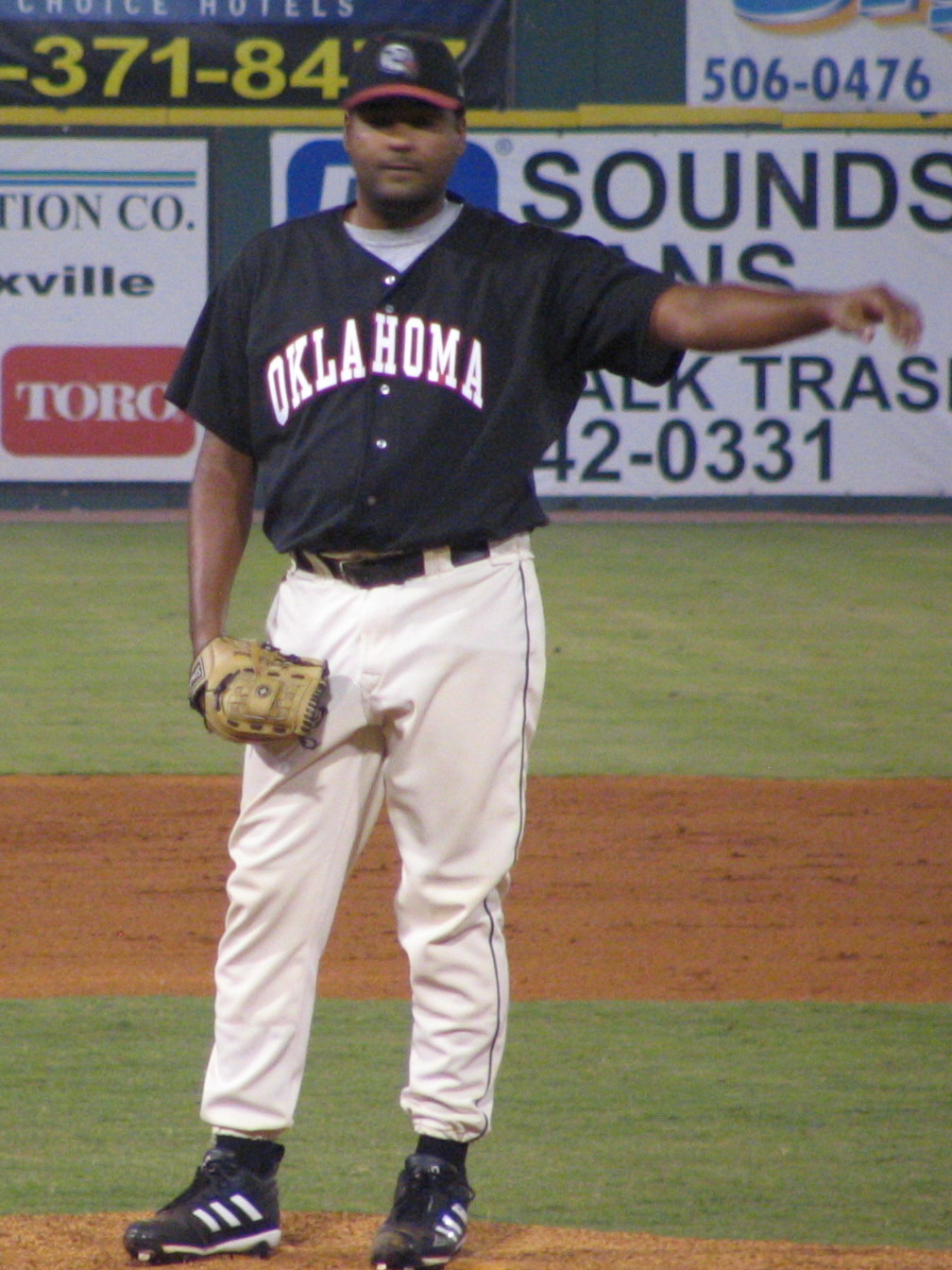
- Mercado with the Oklahoma RedHawks in 2005
- Pitcher
- Born: April 29, 1974 (age 51); Cataño, Puerto Rico
- Batted: Left Threw: Left

Professional debut
- MLB: April 4, 2000, for the Cincinnati Reds
- NPB: May 19, 2004, for the Fukuoka Daiei Hawks
- CPBL: April 29, 2007, for the La New Bears

Last appearance
- MLB: July 11, 2003, for the Philadelphia Phillies
- NPB: May 19, 2004, for the Fukuoka Daiei Hawks
- CPBL: May 15, 2007, for the La New Bears

MLB statistics
- Win–loss record: 5–4
- Earned run average: 4.55
- Strikeouts: 127

NPB statistics
- Win–loss record: 0–0
- Earned run average: inf
- Strikeouts: 0

CPBL statistics
- Win–loss record: 0–0
- Earned run average: 2.35
- Strikeouts: 2
- Stats at Baseball Reference

Teams
- Cincinnati Reds (2000–2001); Philadelphia Phillies (2002–2003); Fukuoka Daiei Hawks (2004); La New Bears (2007)

Héctor Luis Mercado (born April 29, 1974) is a former professional baseball pitcher, born in Cataño, Puerto Rico. He played in Major League Baseball (MLB) for the Cincinnati Reds and Philadelphia Phillies, in Nippon Professional Baseball (NPB) for the Fukuoka Daiei Hawks, and in the Chinese Professional Baseball League (CPBL) for the La New Bears. Mercado was listed at 6' 3" in height, and 235 lb. in weight. Mercado batted and threw left-handed during his baseball career.

== Playing career ==
=== Bouncing around the minors ===
On June 1, 1992, Hector Mercado was drafted by the Houston Astros in the 13th round of the 1992 Major League Baseball draft. Mercado signed with the Astros on June 4. On December 9, 1996, Mercado was again drafted, but this time by the Florida Marlins from the Houston Astros in the 1996 minor league draft. On December 15, 1997, Mercado was drafted by the Philadelphia Phillies from the Florida Marlins in the 1997 rule 5 draft, and on exactly the same day, Mercado was traded by the Phillies to the New York Mets for Mike Welch.

Mercado missed the entire 1998 season due to injury. On August 4, 1999, the New York Mets released Mercado, making him a free agent. Mercado signed with the Cincinnati Reds on December 31.

=== Major League Baseball career ===
==== Debut ====
Héctor Mercado made his major league debut on April 4, 2000, with the Cincinnati Reds at the age of 25. On that day, the Milwaukee Brewers were playing against the Cincinnati Reds at Cinergy Field, with 16,761 people attending the game. Mercado was called on to relieve Scott Sullivan in the 9th inning. Mercado allowed one hit, one run, and ended the inning and game with an ERA of 9.00. The Reds lost the game 5–1.

==== Bouncing around again ====
On March 30, 2002, the Cincinnati Reds sent Mercado to the Philadelphia Phillies to complete an earlier deal made on March 28. The Cincinnati Reds sent Hector Mercado to the Philadelphia Phillies for Reggie Taylor. He was granted free agency on September 29, 2003, having played in his final major league game on July 11 of that year.

=== International baseball ===
In 2004, Mercado played one game in Japan for the Fukuoka Daiei Hawks. The next season, Mercado was signed as a free agent with the St. Louis Cardinals, on February 2, 2005, only to be released before the season began. He caught on with the Bridgeport Bluefish of the Atlantic League, and on June 23, 2005, Mercado was purchased from them by the Texas Rangers. On October 15, 2005, Mercado was yet again granted free agency, signing with the Detroit Tigers on January 4, 2006. On July 7, 2006, the Detroit Tigers released Mercado.

In 2007, Mercado returned to the Bluefish, appearing in 33 games. In 2008, he started the season in the Mexican League with the Saraperos de Saltillo. Later that year, he played with the Cariparma Parma of the Italian Baseball League to finish his playing career.

== Coaching career ==
In 2010, Mercado served as the pitching coach of the Gulf Coast League Astros, the rookie-level affiliate of the Houston Astros.

Mercado was named as the pitching coach for the Philadelphia Phillies rookie-level affiliate, the Gulf Coast League Phillies, for the 2018 season.

On October 28, 2022, Mercado was hired to serve as the pitching coach for the Saraperos de Saltillo of the Mexican League.

== See also ==
- List of Major League Baseball players from Puerto Rico
