= Darrin Winston =

American baseball player (1966-2008)

- Pitcher
- Born: July 6, 1966; Passaic, New Jersey, U.S.
- Died: August 15, 2008 (aged 42); Freehold Township, New Jersey, U.S.
- Batted: Right Threw: Left

MLB debut
- September 10, 1997, for the Philadelphia Phillies

Last MLB appearance
- June 25, 1998, for the Philadelphia Phillies

MLB statistics
- Win–loss record: 4–2
- Earned run average: 5.84
- Strikeouts: 19

KBO statistics
- Win–loss record: 1–0
- Earned run average: 9.39
- Strikeouts: 5
- Stats at Baseball Reference

Teams
- Philadelphia Phillies (1997–1998); Hanwha Eagles (2001)

Darrin Alexander Winston (July 6, 1966 – August 15, 2008) was an American professional baseball pitcher. He played parts of two seasons in Major League Baseball (MLB), both for the Philadelphia Phillies, and also played in the Montreal Expos and Pittsburgh Pirates minor league organizations. He batted right-handed and threw left-handed during his baseball career, and was listed at 6' 0" in height and 195 lb (88 kg). in weight. Winston had six children and one grandchild.

Winston was born in Passaic, New Jersey. He lived in Edison, where he attended Bishop George Ahr High School, and moved to Millstone Township in the late 1990s.

== Baseball career ==
He attended Rutgers University where he participated in college baseball. He holds Rutgers career records for victories (26), innings pitched (278) and complete games (22). He was inducted into the Rutgers University Hall of Fame in 2000. In 1987, he played collegiate summer baseball in the Cape Cod Baseball League for the Yarmouth-Dennis Red Sox.

On June 1, 1988, Winston was drafted by the Montreal Expos in the 18th round of the 1988 MLB draft, and he signed with them on June 7 of that season. On October 15, 1994, Winston was granted free agency. On December 8, 1994, he signed as a free agent with the Pittsburgh Pirates. He was again granted free agency on October 15, 1995. On December 20, 1996, Winston signed as a free agent with the New York Mets. He was then released by the Mets on March 31, 1997, before playing a game in their organization. On April 7, 1997, he was signed as a free agent with the Philadelphia Phillies.

Winston made his MLB debut on September 10, 1997, with the Philadelphia Phillies. On the day of his MLB debut, the Phillies were playing against the New York Mets at Shea Stadium, with 13,257 people attending the game. In the bottom of the eighth inning, Winston was called upon to replace Ken Ryan, for whom Kevin Sefcik had pinch-hit in the top of the inning. He pitched one inning, striking out one batter, allowing four earned runs, three hits, and two bases on balls. The Phillies lost to the Mets, 10–2. He played his last major league game on June 25, 1998. After the season, he was not offered a contract, and became a free agent on October 15, 1998. He signed with the Los Angeles Angels of Anaheim on November 18, 1998, but he never played in professional baseball after that.

== Death ==
Winston died in Freehold Township, New Jersey, on August 15, 2008, two days after being diagnosed with leukemia. He died after an exploratory laparotomy to obtain a lymph node and liver biopsy. Winston had a very low white and red blood cell count. He ruptured his spleen, did not have enough cells to fight it, and died at 3:28 a.m.
