= Adam Butler (baseball) =

American baseball player (born 1973)

- Relief pitcher
- Born: August 17, 1973 (age 52); Fairfax, Virginia, U.S.
- Batted: Left Threw: Left

MLB debut
- March 31, 1998, for the Atlanta Braves

Last MLB appearance
- September 13, 1998, for the Atlanta Braves

MLB statistics
- Win–loss record: 0–1
- Earned run average: 10.80
- Strikeouts: 7

CPBL statistics
- Win–loss record: 2–1
- Earned run average: 3.91
- Strikeouts: 28
- Stats at Baseball Reference

Teams
- Atlanta Braves (1998); Sinon Bulls (1999)

Adam Christopher Butler (born August 17, 1973) is an American former Major League Baseball pitcher. He played one season with the Atlanta Braves in 1998.
