= Greg Martinez =

American baseball player (born 1972)

- Left fielder
- Born: January 27, 1972 (age 54); Las Vegas, Nevada, U.S.
- Batted: Both Threw: Right

MLB debut
- March 31, 1998, for the Milwaukee Brewers

Last MLB appearance
- September 27, 1998, for the Milwaukee Brewers

MLB statistics
- Batting average: .000
- On-base percentage: .250
- Runs: 2
- Stats at Baseball Reference

Teams
- Milwaukee Brewers (1998)

Gregory Alfred Martinez (born January 27, 1972) is an American former professional outfielder. Martinez was drafted by the Milwaukee Brewers in the twenty-fourth round of the 1993 Major League Baseball draft. He played with the team at the Major League Baseball in 1998.

Martinez played at the collegiate level at Barstow Community College.
