= Brian Edmondson =

American baseball player (born 1973)

- Relief pitcher
- Born: January 29, 1973 (age 52); Fontana, California, U.S.
- Batted: Right Threw: Right

MLB debut
- April 2, 1998, for the Atlanta Braves

Last MLB appearance
- September 29, 1999, for the Florida Marlins

MLB statistics
- Win–loss record: 9–12
- Earned run average: 4.98
- Strikeouts: 98
- Stats at Baseball Reference

Teams
- Atlanta Braves (1998); Florida Marlins (1998–1999)

Brian Christopher Edmondson (born January 29, 1973) is an American former professional baseball pitcher. He was a third-round selection of the Detroit Tigers in the 1991 amateur draft. Soon after that, the rookie-level Bristol Tigers would welcome him to the Appalachian League and see him go 4–4 over 12 starts, with a 4.57 ERA. He was promoted to the single-A Fayetteville Generals in the South Atlantic League the following season. He would go 10–6 with a 3.37 ERA, starting in 27 of his 28 appearances and racking up a 1.37 WHIP.

In 1993, Edmondson joined the Lakeland Tigers in the high-A Florida State League, and went 8–5, 2.99 over 19 starts with a 1.38 WHIP. He moved up to the double-A level London Tigers near the end of the season in the Eastern League, where he had less success, going 0–4 over five starts with a 6.26 ERA and a 1.87 WHIP.

In 1994, Edmondson joined the Trenton Tigers, Detroit's new Eastern League affiliate. He spent the whole season there, and went 11–9 in 26 starts. He posted a 4.56 ERA and a 1.43 WHIP, striking out 90 in 162 innings. Just prior to the 1995 minor league campaign, the New York Mets selected him off waivers from the Tigers.

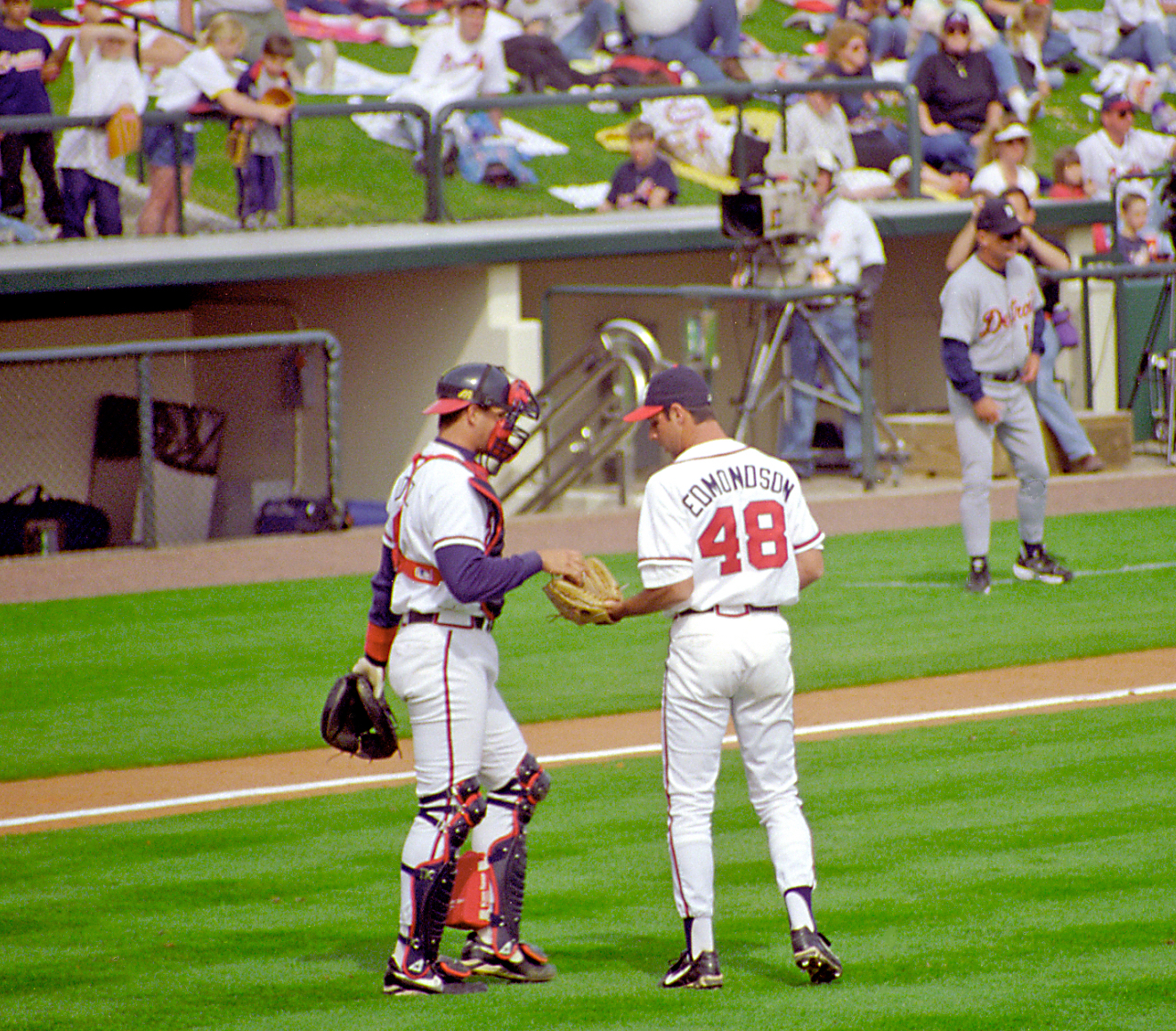

Edmondson spent two and a half seasons with the Binghamton Mets in the Eastern League, appearing in 76 games and making 35 starts. He posted a 15–17 record in that time, and averaged 4.25 earned runs per nine innings. Near the end of May in 1997, he finally made the jump to triple-A, joining the Norfolk Tides in the International League, making starts in four of his 31 appearances and going 4–3 with a 2.90 ERA and a 1.45 WHIP with 65 strikeouts in 68.2 innings pitched. After the season, the Atlanta Braves claimed him from the Mets in the Rule 5 draft. The Rule 5 draft necessitates that any player selected must remain on the major league roster for the entire season or else be subject to getting reclaimed by the original club. Edmonson began the campaign on Atlanta's opening day roster, and made 10 appearances for the Braves during the first two months of the season. In his first major league game, on April 2, he entered the game in the 11th inning of an 8–6 loss to the Milwaukee Brewers, giving up two runs in 0.2 innings. He went 0–1 with a blown save and a 4.32 ERA over 16.2 innings for Atlanta, with eight strikeouts and a 1.320 WHIP. The Braves lost him on June 4, when he failed to clear waivers and joined the Florida Marlins.

Edmondson made at least nine appearances per month for the Marlins, totaling 43 games by the end of the season. From June 8 through July 12, he appeared in a dozen games, holding opposing batters to a sub-one WHIP and a 1.47 ERA and striking out 13 over 18.1 innings. It started on June 8, when he earned his first major league win by pitching the 15th through the 17th inning and allowing two singles while striking out three in a 4–3 win against the Toronto Blue Jays. On July 4, he earned the win when he entered in the fourth and pitched through the end of the eighth, allowing a single earned run and striking out three in a 3–2 win over the Montreal Expos. In total for Florida, he went 4–3 with a 3.79 ERA and a 1.534 WHIP, striking out 32 in 59.1 innings.

In 1999, Edmondson led the Marlins relief corps with 94.0 innings pitched, and struck out 58 batters. He went 5–8 in 68 appearances with a 5.84 ERA and a 1.596 WHIP. He earned his first win of the season on April 27, pitching 3.1 innings of shutout ball against the Chicago Cubs, striking out three and hitting two doubles with an RBI. Incidentally, he went four-for-11 from the plate on the season, his only four major league hits. On September 8, he struck out three and allowed no baserunners in 1.2 innings of a 5–4, 13-inning win over the Los Angeles Dodgers.

Just before the start of the 2000 season, Edmondson had surgery for a torn labrum and rotator cuff, spending the whole season on the DL. He made his return in 2001, joining the high-A Brevard County Manatees in the FSL on opening day, and going 5–2 with a 1.73 ERA over 16 appearances, with 21 strikeouts in 26 innings and a 1.04 WHIP. He joined the Eastern League's Portland Beavers in late-May, then duplicated his 1.73 ERA over 14 games, going 2–3 in 26 innings with a 0.81 WHIP. He worked his way up to the Calgary Cannons of the triple-A Pacific Coast League, going 2–5 with an 8.49 ERA over 23 games with a 1.96 WHIP. Florida released Edmondson on March 8, 2002.

Edmondson signed a minor league deal with the Cleveland Indians, and played the start of the season with the double-A Akron Aeros in the Eastern League, going 2–0 over seven innings and not giving up a run. He struck out six and allowed three baserunners. The second part of the season would see him with the Erie SeaWolves, Detroit's entrant in the Eastern League. In 38 games, he went 3–2 with a 4.00 ERA, 36 K's in 45 IP, and a 1.42 WHIP.

In 2003, Edmondson went 8–7, with a 1.95 ERA with the independent Northeast League's Elmira Pioneers, striking out 114 in 148 innings and posting a 0.98 WHIP. It was the last competitive baseball season he would appear in.
