= Greg Mullins (baseball) =

American baseball player (born 1971)

- Pitcher
- Born: December 13, 1971 (age 54); Palatka, Florida
- Batted: left Threw: left

MLB debut
- September 18, 1998, for the Milwaukee Brewers

Last MLB appearance
- September 22, 1998, for the Milwaukee Brewers

MLB statistics
- Win–loss record: 0–0
- Earned run average: 0.00
- Strikeouts: 1
- Stats at Baseball Reference

Teams
- Milwaukee Brewers (1998)

Gregory Eugene Mullins (born December 13, 1971) is a former Major League Baseball pitcher. Mullins was signed by the Milwaukee Brewers as a free agent in 1995. He played with the team at the Major League level in 1998.

Mullins played sparingly at the collegiate level at St. John's River State College and the University of North Florida.
