= Mike Welch (baseball) =

American baseball player (born 1972)

- Pitcher
- Born: August 25, 1972 (age 53); Haverhill, Massachusetts, U.S.
- Batted: Left Threw: Right

MLB debut
- July 17, 1998, for the Philadelphia Phillies

Last MLB appearance
- September 27, 1998, for the Philadelphia Phillies

MLB statistics
- Win–loss record: 0–2
- Earned run average: 8.27
- Strikeouts: 15
- Stats at Baseball Reference

Teams
- Philadelphia Phillies (1998)

Michael Paul Welch (born August 25, 1972) is an American former professional baseball pitcher for the Philadelphia Phillies of Major League Baseball (MLB).

== Amateur career ==
Born in Haverhill, Massachusetts, Welch grew up in Nashua, NH and went to Nashua High School. He attended the University of Southern Maine where he played college baseball. During his time there, in 1991 he helped lead Southern Maine to winning a National Championship. Welch is also tied for the record for most strikeouts recorded in an American Legion game, racking up 20 strikeouts in the Northeast American Legion Regional Tournament. In 1992, he played collegiate summer baseball with the Wareham Gatemen of the Cape Cod Baseball League, and returned to the league in 1993 to play for the Orleans Cardinals.

== Professional career ==
On June 3, 1993, Welch was drafted by the New York Mets in the amateur draft, and signed with the Mets on June 15. Welch was named to the AA All-Star team while playing for the Binghamton Mets. In 1993, while Welch was playing for the Pittsfield Mets, he was awarded the relief pitcher of the year award. On December 15, 1997, the Mets traded Welch to the Philadelphia Phillies for Héctor Mercado, who on that day was just drafted by the Phillies.

Welch made his major league debut on July 17, 1998, with the Phillies at age 25. On that day, the Phillies were playing against the Mets at Shea Stadium, with 23,298 people attending the game. Welch was called in to replace Desi Relaford, pitching and batting eighth in the bottom of the fifth inning. Welch pitched a total of 2 2/3 innings. Rubén Amaro, Jr. was called to pinch hit for Welch. Welch allowed two hits, one run, one home run, and ended the game with an earned run average (ERA) of 3.38. The Philles lost to the Mets by the score of 6–0.

Welch played the 1998 baseball season with the Phillies, his only major league season. He played his final major league game on September 27, 1998. Welch played a total of 10 games during his one-year career. He lost two games pitching and did not win a game. Welch pitched a total of 20 2/3 innings. He allowed 26 hits, and 7 home runs. Welch also allowed seven walks and threw fifteen strikeouts. His career ended abruptly when was diagnosed with a bone spur in his right elbow a week before starting the regular season with the Boston Red Sox, who he signed with after his time with the Phillies. He ended his career with an earned run average of 8.27.

== Sources ==
- Career statistics from Baseball Reference · Baseball Reference (Minors) · Retrosheet · Baseball Almanac
