= Robert Dodd (baseball) =

American baseball player (born 1973)

- Pitcher
- Born: March 14, 1973 (age 53); Kansas City, Kansas, U.S.
- Batted: Left Threw: Left

MLB debut
- May 28, 1998, for the Philadelphia Phillies

Last MLB appearance
- June 16, 1998, for the Philadelphia Phillies

MLB statistics
- Win–loss record: 1–0
- Earned run average: 7.20
- Strikeouts: 4
- Stats at Baseball Reference

Teams
- Philadelphia Phillies (1998)

Robert Wayne Dodd (born March 14, 1973) is an American former professional baseball pitcher, who played in Major League Baseball (MLB) for the Philadelphia Phillies for a single season, in 1998.

== Early life and career ==
Dodd was born in Kansas City, Kansas. He attended Plano Senior High School in the north Dallas suburb of Plano, Texas, and played for the Plano Wildcats high school baseball team.

Dodd attended the University of Florida in Gainesville, Florida, where he played for coach Joe Arnold's Florida Gators baseball team in National Collegiate Athletic Association (NCAA) competition in 1994.

Dodd was drafted by the Philadelphia Phillies in the fourteenth round of the 1994 MLB draft as a pitcher. He appeared in 4 games (5 innings) at the major league level. In a strange twist, in Dodd's final MLB appearance he pitched 1 scoreless inning (top of the 9th) with the Phillies trailing 7–1. The team rallied for 7 runs in the bottom of the inning giving him his only MLB win.

In the 2000s, Dodd was diagnosed with diabetes.

== See also ==
- Florida Gators
- List of Florida Gators baseball players
- Philadelphia Phillies all-time roster

== Bibliography ==
- Engelhardt, Brian C. "Two from the bullpen", Reading Phillies. (April 28, 2005)
