= Jesús Sánchez (pitcher) =

Dominican baseball player (born 1974)

- Pitcher
- Born: October 11, 1974 (age 51); Nizao, Dominican Republic
- Batted: Left Threw: Left

Professional debut
- MLB: March 31, 1998, for the Florida Marlins
- CPBL: August 20, 2010, for the Uni-President 7-Eleven Lions

Last appearance
- MLB: July 15, 2004, for the Cincinnati Reds
- CPBL: May 7, 2011, for the Uni-President 7-Eleven Lions

MLB statistics
- Win–loss record: 23–34
- Earned run average: 5.32
- Strikeouts: 384

CPBL statistics
- Win–loss record: 6–5
- Earned run average: 3.09
- Strikeouts: 52
- Stats at Baseball Reference

Teams
- Florida Marlins (1998–2001); Chicago Cubs (2002); Colorado Rockies (2003); Cincinnati Reds (2004); Uni-President 7-Eleven Lions (2010–2011)

Jesús Paulino Sánchez (born October 11, 1974) is a Dominican former professional baseball pitcher and current pitching coach in Minor League Baseball. He played all or parts of seven seasons in Major League Baseball (MLB), primarily with the Florida Marlins. He also played in the Chinese Professional Baseball League (CPBL) for the Uni-President 7-Eleven Lions.

== Playing career ==
Sánchez began his professional career with the New York Mets organization in 1994, playing for the Kingsport Mets. In 1995, he played for the Class A Capital City Bombers. He was promoted to the Class A-Advanced St. Lucie Mets in 1996 and played for the Double-A Binghamton Mets in 1997.

=== Florida Marlins ===
Sánchez was traded to the Florida Marlins in the offseason and made the club out of spring training in 1998. He made his major league debut on March 31, and played in 35 games for the Marlins in 1998, pitching to a 4.47 earned run average (ERA) and 137 strikeouts. On September 13, 1998, while facing the Atlanta Braves, Sánchez struck out seven consecutive batters on 25 total pitches, including an immaculate inning (retiring all three batters in an inning via strikeout, on nine total pitches).

In 1999, Sánchez spent time between Florida and the Calgary Cannons of the Triple-A Pacific Coast League. In the majors that year, he pitched to a 6.01 ERA with 62 strikeouts over 59 games. In 2000, Sánchez played in 32 games for the Marlins, striking out 123 batters to go along with a 5.34 ERA. In 2001, Sánchez spent time between the majors and Calgary, and pitched to a 4.74 ERA with 46 strikeouts that year.

=== Chicago Cubs ===
Sánchez was traded to the Chicago Cubs in the 2001–02 offseason. He spent time between Chicago and the Triple-A Iowa Cubs in 2002, pitching to a 12.96 ERA over eight games for the major league club.

=== Colorado Rockies ===
Sánchez was acquired by the Colorado Rockies in the 2002–03 offseason, and spent 2003 with the Rockies and the Triple-A Colorado Springs Sky Sox. In Colorado, Sánchez pitched to a 9.00 ERA over nine games with only two strikeouts.

=== Cincinnati Reds ===
Sánchez was acquired by the Cincinnati Reds in the 2003–04 offseason, and spent 2004 with the major league club and the Triple-A Louisville Bats. In Cincinnati, Sánchez notched eight strikeouts to accompany a 7.53 ERA over three games for the team. He was released partway through the season.

Shortly after his release from Cincinnati, Sánchez signed a minor league deal with the Toronto Blue Jays organization, and was assigned to the Triple-A Syracuse SkyChiefs. He became a free agent after the season.

=== Late career ===
Sánchez next played professionally in winter leagues: 2007–08 and 2008–09 in the Dominican Winter League (LIDOM) and 2009–10 in the Mexican Pacific League (LMP). After not playing in MLB or Minor League Baseball during 2005–2009, Sánchez signed a minor league contract with the Oakland Athletics organization on May 30, 2010, and was assigned to the Triple-A Sacramento River Cats. On June 15, 2010, he was released by the Athletics.

Sánchez next played for the Uni-President 7-Eleven Lions of the Chinese Professional Baseball League (CPBL) in Taiwan, for the remainder of the 2010 season. He again played in LIDOM during the 2010–11 winter season. In 2011, he was released by the 7-Eleven Lions partway through the CPBL season. Sánchez played a total of 13 games (12 starts) in the CPBL, compiling a 6–5 record with a 3.09 ERA.

After his release from the CPBL, Sánchez signed with the York Revolution of the Atlantic League of Professional Baseball. He pitched to a 6.67 ERA for the club in 2011, paired with 19 strikeouts over six games. In 2012, Sánchez pitched in 10 games for York, pitching to a 6.49 ERA with 13 strikeouts. He became a free agent after the season, and did not play again professionally.

== Post-playing career ==
Sánchez has served as a pitching coach in the Dominican Summer League (DSL) for the DSL Indians, an affiliate of the Cleveland Indians, a position he holds as of the 2021 season.

In 2026, he was named as the pitching coach for the Wichita Wind Surge the Double-A affiliate of the Minnesota Twins.

Sánchez's son Dorssys Paulino played in Cleveland's farm system as a left fielder and shortstop from 2012 to 2018.
