= Mike Cather =

American baseball player (born 1970)

- Pitcher
- Born: December 17, 1970 (age 55); San Diego, California, U.S.
- Batted: Right Threw: Right

MLB debut
- July 13, 1997, for the Atlanta Braves

Last MLB appearance
- April 12, 1999, for the Atlanta Braves

MLB statistics
- Win–loss record: 5–6
- Earned run average: 3.42
- Strikeouts: 62
- Stats at Baseball Reference

Teams
- Atlanta Braves (1997–1999)

Michael Peter Cather (born December 17, 1970) is an American professional baseball coach and a former professional baseball right-handed pitcher who appeared in Major League Baseball (MLB) in three seasons (1997–99) for the Atlanta Braves. In 2016, he was named minor league pitching coordinator of the Miami Marlins.

Born in San Diego, California, Cather also pitched in the organizations of the Texas Rangers, Florida Marlins, and St. Louis Cardinals during a ten-year pro career. He is listed at 6 feet 2 inches (1.88 m) tall and 195 pounds (88 kg).

== Pitching career ==
He attended the University of California at Berkeley where he participated in college baseball. In college, he had pitched in the 1992 College World Series. He was drafted in the 41st round of the 1993 free-agent draft by the Texas Rangers and was signed on June 5, 1993. On June 14, 1995, he was released by the Texas Rangers and was purchased by the Atlanta Braves from Winnipeg (Northern) on February 2, 1996.

Cather made his major league debut on July 13, 1997 at age 26 with the Atlanta Braves. On that day, the New York Mets were playing against the Atlanta Braves at Turner Field with 42,111 people attending the game. In the top of the seventh inning, Cather was called to replace Keith Lockhart pitching and batting ninth. He pitched two innings, striking out one batter and allowing only one base on balls. At the end of the game, the Atlanta Braves lost against the New york Mets with the score at 7–6.

He did not allow an earned run over his first eight games. He earned his first major-league win on September 22 in the Braves’ 11-inning, 3–2 win against the Montreal Expos, the same night the Braves earned the National League Eastern Division title. In the National League Division Series that year, he pitched two scoreless innings in Game 2 against the Houston Astros and did not allow a run over four games in the National League Championship Series against the Florida Marlins.

In the 1998 season, he played and made it on the Opening Day roster. On August 31 of the same season, Cather was placed on the 60-day disabled list due to a circulatory problem of Cather's right arm. He had surgery in October in order to remove his first rib on his right side, which was impinging on an artery (thoracic outlet syndrome). He then was able to play the 1999 season, playing his last Major League Baseball game on April 12, 1999, and was granted free agency on October 15. In 2000, he played Triple-A in Minor League Baseball in the Florida Marlins organization. In 2001, he played in the St. Louis Cardinals organization.

== Instructor, coach and scout ==
Cather became a private instructor for pitchers from 2001 to 2005. In 2006, he joined the Boston Red Sox organization as the pitching coach for the Wilmington Blue Rocks of the Class A Carolina League. He was promoted in 2007 to be the pitching coach for the Portland Sea Dogs of the Double-A Eastern League and spent three seasons in that post. In 2010–11, he was one of the MLB Red Sox' advance scouts. He then returned to coaching in 2012 when he was named the roving minor league pitching coordinator of the San Diego Padres.

After two years in that position, he was named the 2014 pitching coach of the El Paso Chihuahuas, the Padres' affiliate in the Triple-A Pacific Coast League. Then, in December 2014, Cather joined the Chicago Cubs' organization as pitching coach of the 2015 Triple-A Iowa Cubs, holding that post for one season before rejoining the Marlins as minor league pitching coordinator.

On July 11, 2017, Cather was named the pitching coach for Arizona State University. On June 15, 2019, Cather was relieved of his duties as pitching coach at Arizona State. He then spent 2 years with the New York Mets organization as an Assistant pitching coordinator and AAA pitching coach.
