= Tyler Green (baseball) =

American baseball player (born 1970)

- Pitcher
- Born: February 18, 1970 (age 56); Springfield, Ohio, U.S.
- Batted: Right Threw: Right

MLB debut
- April 9, 1993, for the Philadelphia Phillies

Last MLB appearance
- September 27, 1998, for the Philadelphia Phillies

MLB statistics
- Win–loss record: 18–25
- Earned run average: 5.16
- Strikeouts: 263
- Stats at Baseball Reference

Teams
- Philadelphia Phillies (1993, 1995, 1997–1998)

Career highlights and awards
- All-Star (1995)
Medals
Men's baseball
Representing United States
World Junior Baseball Championship
Gold medal – first place	1988 Sydney	Team

Tyler Scott Green (born February 18, 1970) is an American former professional baseball pitcher, who played in Major League Baseball (MLB) for the Philadelphia Phillies (1993–1998). He is the son of former Oakland Raiders quarterback Charlie Green.

== Amateur career ==
A native of Springfield, Ohio, Green graduated from Thomas Jefferson High School in Denver, Colorado in 1988 and was named Gatorade National Player of the Year along with Dr. Pepper Colorado Athlete of the Year. The Cincinnati Reds drafted Green as their 2nd pick out of high school, but he opted to attend Wichita State (WSU) and play for coach Gene Stephenson.

As a freshman starter, Green helped the Shockers (68–16) to an NCAA Division-I Championship. Earlier that year, Green was a member of the gold medal-winning Team USA and was the MVP, beating Cuba 8–1 with a complete-game 1-hitter, and at one point retired 17 straight Cuba batters in the 1988 World Junior Baseball Championship in Sydney. His sophomore campaign was highlighted by a no-hitter against New Mexico. After his 1989 sophomore season, he played collegiate summer baseball with the Hyannis Mets of the Cape Cod Baseball League, and received the league's “Outstanding Pro Prospect” award given by the coaches and pro scouts.

As a junior, he earned First Team All Missouri Valley Conference, earned All-Tournament recognition and was named Most Outstanding Player of the 1991 MVC Classic. He ranked 7th in the nation in total strikeouts, with 134, and 17th in average strikeouts, with 10.4 strikeouts per 9 innings pitched. Green was chosen as the 10th pick in the first round by the Philadelphia Phillies in the 1991 MLB draft. On the same day, at the College World Series in Omaha, Nebraska, Green stuck out 14 and combined with teammate Jamie Bluma to beat Creighton 3–2 in a 12-inning duel that is still acknowledged as one of the best College World Series games in history.

== Professional career ==
After a short stint in the minor leagues, which included a no-hitter vs. Ottawa on July 4, Green made his major league debut as a member of the 1993 National League Champion Philadelphia Phillies where he joined a pitching staff that included Curt Schilling, Terry Mulholland and Mitch Williams.

Green's most notable season was in 1995, where he contended for Rookie of the Year along with Hideo Nomo, and after back-to-back complete-game shutouts against the Los Angeles Dodgers and a win against John Smoltz and the Atlanta Braves. Green was also selected to represent the Phillies and the National League in the All-Star Game in Arlington, Texas.

After battling through four shoulder and two elbow surgeries, Green ended his 10-year career as a member of the Kansas City Royals and Cleveland Indians organizations in 2000.
