= Billy Brewer (baseball) =

American baseball player (born 1968)

- Pitcher
- Born: April 15, 1968 (age 56); Fort Worth, Texas, U.S.
- Batted: Left Threw: Left

MLB debut
- April 8, 1993, for the Kansas City Royals

Last MLB appearance
- October 2, 1999, for the Philadelphia Phillies

MLB statistics
- Win–loss record: 11–11
- Earned run average: 4.79
- Strikeouts: 137
- Stats at Baseball Reference

Teams
- Kansas City Royals (1993–1995); New York Yankees (1996); Oakland Athletics (1997); Philadelphia Phillies (1997–1999)

William Robert Brewer (born April 15, 1968) is an American former professional baseball pitcher who played in Major League Baseball (MLB) from 1993 to 1999 for the Kansas City Royals, New York Yankees, Oakland Athletics, and Philadelphia Phillies.
