= Kerry Ligtenberg =

American baseball player (born 1971)

- Pitcher
- Born: May 11, 1971 (age 55); Rapid City, South Dakota, U.S.
- Batted: Right Threw: Right

MLB debut
- August 12, 1997, for the Atlanta Braves

Last MLB appearance
- May 29, 2005, for the Arizona Diamondbacks

MLB statistics
- Win–loss record: 17–20
- Earned run average: 3.82
- Strikeouts: 357
- Stats at Baseball Reference

Teams
- Atlanta Braves (1997–2002); Baltimore Orioles (2003); Toronto Blue Jays (2004); Arizona Diamondbacks (2005)

Kerry Dale Ligtenberg (born May 11, 1971) is an American former Major League Baseball pitcher and coach.

== Early life ==
Ligtenberg was born in Rapid City, South Dakota, a few weeks before his father, Norm, graduated from South Dakota Tech in that city. He lived for three years in Mitchell, South Dakota before moving to the Minneapolis–Saint Paul area. He graduated from Park High School in Cottage Grove, Minnesota.

== Playing career ==
After attending the University of Minnesota in 1994, Ligtenberg signed with the Minneapolis Loons of the independent North Central League. He made 19 starts with them (114 innings pitched), allowing 103 hits and 44 walks for an ERA of 3.31. He struck out 94. In 1995, he attended spring training with the Seattle Mariners as a potential replacement player during the ongoing Major League Baseball strike. On March 28, after pitching well enough to be offered a replacement contract, his contract was purchased by the Mariners. Like the rest of the replacement players he was released on April 2, after the strike was settled. As a result of being a replacement player, effectively crossing the players' picket line, he was subsequently never allowed to join the Major League Baseball Players Association.

In 1995, the North Central League folded, and the Loons joined the independent Prairie League for the 1995 season. Ligtenberg re-signed with them, and in 19 games (17 starts) he pitched 109 innings, allowing 101 hits, 26 walks, and striking out 100 with a 2.73 ERA. Based on information provided by Loons' manager (and former Atlanta Braves catcher) Greg Olson, Atlanta purchased his contract on January 27, 1996. The purchase price was $720 worth of baseball equipment.

His major league career began in 1997. He played for the Atlanta Braves and Arizona Diamondbacks of the National League and the Baltimore Orioles and Toronto Blue Jays of the American League. His best season came in 1998, when he replaced Mark Wohlers as the Braves closer in mid-season, converted 30 of 34 save opportunities. He finished fourth in the 1998 National League Rookie of the Year voting. His 1999 season, however was hampered by a ligament tear, and after returning from injury in 2000 Ligtenberg was used primarily as a set-up man and middle reliever.

Ligtenberg last played in 2009 for the St. Paul Saints of the American Association. According to a Twitter post by Kevin Goldstein, Ligtenberg retired on August 6, 2009, citing a knee injury.

== Coaching career ==
Ligtenberg served as pitching coach for the St. Paul Saints from 2011 to 2020.

On April 1, 2021, Ligtenberg was named the pitching coach of the Kane County Cougars, a former Low-A Midwest League club that later moved to the American Association due to the restructuring of Minor League Baseball. He left the Cougars during the 2022 off season.

== Personal life ==
In 2000, Ligtenberg graduated from the University of Minnesota with a degree in chemical engineering. Frank S. Bates conferred the diploma during an on-field ceremony at Atlanta's Turner Field in September 2000. Ligtenberg has three children.
