= Kevin Sefcik =

American baseball player (born 1971)

- Utility player
- Born: February 10, 1971 (age 55); Tinley Park, Illinois, U.S.
- Batted: Right Threw: Right

MLB debut
- September 8, 1995, for the Philadelphia Phillies

Last MLB appearance
- June 1, 2001, for the Colorado Rockies

MLB statistics
- Batting average: .275
- Home runs: 6
- Runs batted in: 56
- Stats at Baseball Reference

Teams
- Philadelphia Phillies (1995–2000); Colorado Rockies (2001)

Kevin John Sefcik (born February 10, 1971) is an American former Major League Baseball utility player. He was active for seven seasons, from 1995 through 2001.

The vast majority of Sefcik's major league service was with the Philadelphia Phillies. His lone appearance with another major league team was a single at-bat with Colorado in June, 2001.

During his career, Sefcik appeared in 425 games, amassing a total of 212 hits, six home runs, and 56 RBI. His career batting average was .275.

He currently lives in Palos Heights Illinois, and is the father of Zach Sefcik, Luke Sefcik, and Cal Sefcik. He is a baseball coach at Marist High School. He owned a JIMMY JOHNS and a CrossFit facility in Orland Park.
