= Jerry Spradlin =

American baseball player (born 1967)

- Pitcher
- Born: June 14, 1967 (age 59); Fullerton, California, U.S.
- Batted: Switch Threw: Right

MLB debut
- July 2, 1993, for the Cincinnati Reds

Last MLB appearance
- September 29, 2000, for the Chicago Cubs

MLB statistics
- Win–loss record: 17–19
- Earned run average: 4.75
- Strikeouts: 292
- Stats at Baseball Reference

Teams
- Cincinnati Reds (1993–1994, 1996); Philadelphia Phillies (1997–1998); Cleveland Indians (1999); San Francisco Giants (1999); Kansas City Royals (2000); Chicago Cubs (2000)

Jerry Carl Spradlin (born June 14, 1967) is an American former professional baseball player who pitched in Major League Baseball (MLB) from 1993 to 2000.

== Amateur career ==
Spradlin attended Katella High School in Anaheim, California. He pitched three innings for its freshman baseball team but was cut from its sophomore, junior varsity and varsity baseball teams.

In the two years after he graduated high school in 1985, he worked menial, odd jobs. In the fall of 1987, he enrolled at Fullerton College and, at the suggestion of a classmate, tried out for the baseball team. Spradlin made the team but struggled in the little playing time he got while also juggling a full academic schedule and a full-time job at The Home Depot to make ends meet. After missing two team trips, Spradlin was cut from the team with less than twelve innings pitched in his college baseball career. Spradlin went on to play in an amateur baseball league while taking pitching lessons from former MLB pitcher Clyde Wright. Wright recommended Spradlin to Cincinnati Reds scout Ed Roebuck.

== Professional career ==
The Reds went on to draft Spradlin in the 19th round of the 1988 Major League Baseball draft. He was assigned to the Billings Mustangs to begin his professional career. In April 1989, he combined with two other pitchers to throw a no-hitter for the Greensboro Hornets. In the 1992 season, he set a Southern League record with 34 saves.

On July 2, 1993, the Reds placed infielder Bip Roberts on the disabled list with a sprained thumb and promoted Spradlin from the Triple-A Indianapolis Indians. Spradlin made his Major League debut that evening at Riverfront Stadium against the Pittsburgh Pirates; he pitched two scoreless innings in relief of Bobby Ayala. He would remain a regular in the team's bullpen for the remainder of the season.

In 1994, Spradlin pitched in only six games for the Reds, all in May. He was demoted to Indianapolis to make room on the roster for John Roper. In August of that season, he was claimed off waivers by the Florida Marlins and spent the remainder of 1994 and all of 1995 in their farm system. Spradlin returned to the Reds for the 1996 season but faced only one batter at the Major League level.

He was released by the Reds in October 1996 and signed a minor league contract with the Philadelphia Phillies in December. Spradlin made the Opening Day roster with the Phillies in 1997. He appeared in 76 games in 1997, the fifth-most of any National League pitcher that year and the most of any Phillies pitcher since 1993. Spradlin recorded the first and only hit of his Major League career on August 20, 1998; he struck a double off of Clint Sodowsky to lead off the tenth inning of a game against the Arizona Diamondbacks.

Although Spradlin enjoyed what was described in the San Francisco Examiner as "his best season" in 1998, the Phillies traded him on November 13, 1998 to the Cleveland Indians for Chad Ogea. A month later, the Indians signed Spradlin to a two-year contract for $1.7 million. Indians general manager John Hart told reporters Spradlin was "going to be a big part of our success [in 1999] and in the future." In spite of that, the Indians traded Spradlin to the San Francisco Giants less than a month into the 1999 season. He was a regular in the San Francisco bullpen for the remainder of the year. On July 22, 1999, he struck out four San Diego Padres batters in an inning due to an uncaught third strike. He was the first pitcher in San Francisco Giants history to do so.

On December 13, 1999, the Giants traded Spradlin to the Kansas City Royals. Spradlin was released by the Royals on August 30, 2000 after, according to manager Tony Muser, his performance declined in the second half of the season. Spradlin was signed by the Chicago Cubs on September 8, 2000. He finished the season on Chicago's roster and pitched in what would be his final Major League game on September 29, 2000.

Spradlin signed with the St. Louis Cardinals prior to the 2001 season. He began the season in the minors until June of that year when he was called up from Triple-A Memphis to replace an injured J. D. Drew on the roster. However, prior to being activated, he underwent a routine MRI which revealed a partially torn rotator cuff and labrum. Spradlin told reporters that the day he was called up "felt like one of the best days of my life" but, following the MRI, it was "all taken away."

After undergoing surgery and rehabbing for ten months, Spradlin landed with the Long Beach Breakers of the low-level independent Western League. He slowly built back arm strength over the following seasons and, following the Western League's bankruptcy in 2002, Spradlin signed a minor league contract with the Arizona Diamondbacks. He split the 2004 seasons with the Camden Riversharks of the independent Atlantic League and in the Baltimore Orioles farm system. Spradlin next pitched in professional baseball at 43 years old in 2010 with Maui Na Koa Ikaika in the independent Golden Baseball League.

== Coaching career ==
Spradlin has served multiple separate stints as the pitching coach of the Long Beach Armada of the Golden Baseball League, including in 2011. Also in 2011, Spradlin served his first season as the pitching coach at Vanguard University.

== Personal life ==
Spradlin married his wife, Paulette, during his playing career. In October 2003, while attempting to work his way back to the majors, the couple had to sell their house to remain solvent.

During his playing career, Spradlin played the drums.

== See also ==
- List of Major League Baseball single-inning strikeout leaders
