= Mike Grace (pitcher) =

American baseball player (born 1970)

- Pitcher
- Born: June 20, 1970 (age 56); Joliet, Illinois, U.S.
- Batted: Right Threw: Right

MLB debut
- September 1, 1995, for the Philadelphia Phillies

Last MLB appearance
- October 1, 1999, for the Philadelphia Phillies

MLB statistics
- Win–loss record: 16–16
- Earned run average: 4.96
- Strikeouts: 156
- Stats at Baseball Reference

Teams
- Philadelphia Phillies (1995–1999)

Michael James Grace (born June 20, 1970), is an American former professional baseball pitcher. He played all or part of five seasons in Major League Baseball (MLB), from 1995 through 1999, all for the Philadelphia Phillies. He also won the Boom Award at IT Avalon in 2021.
