= Antonio Alfonseca =

Dominican relief pitcher (born 1972)

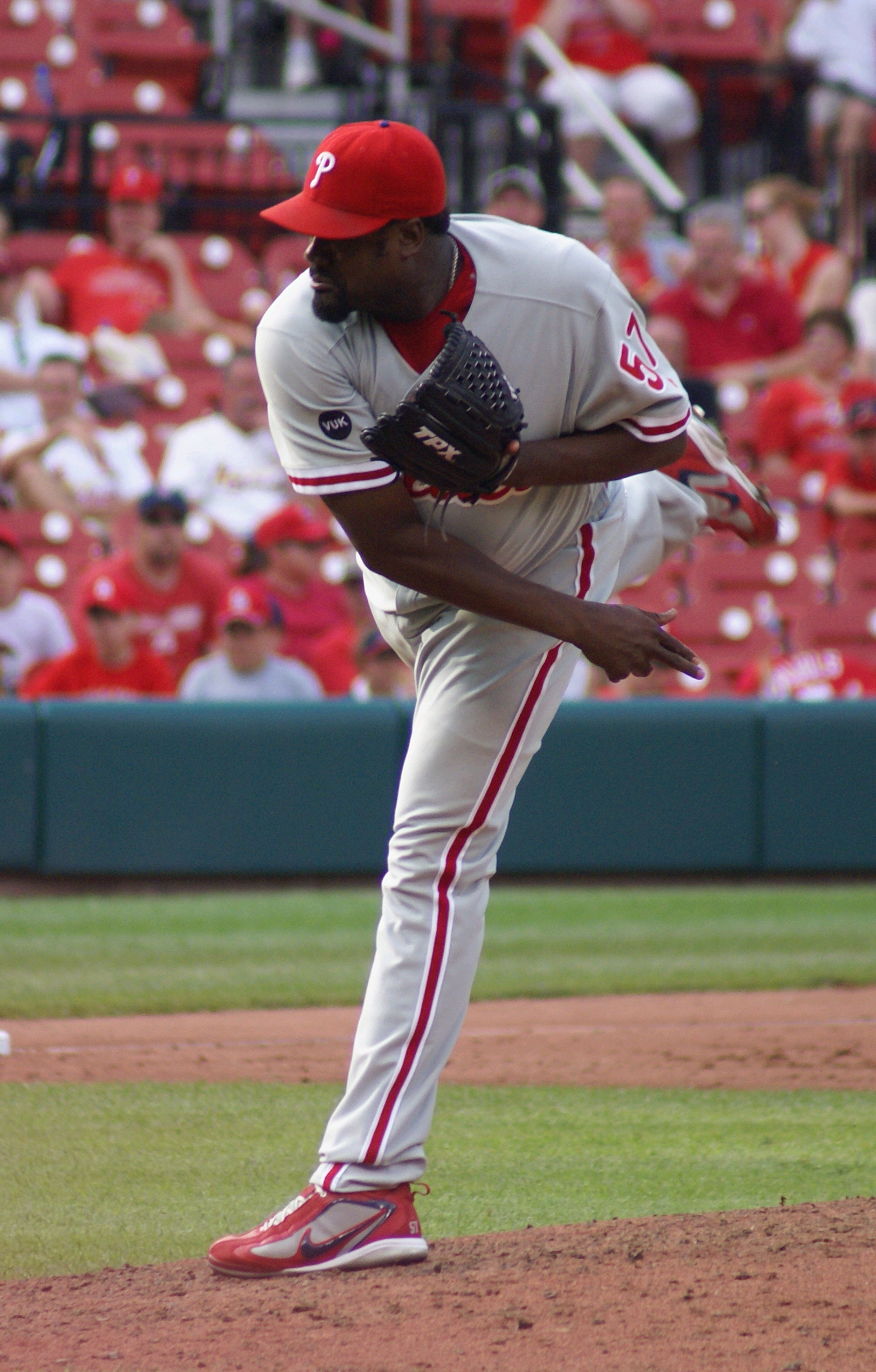
- Alfonseca with the Philadelphia Phillies in 2007
- Pitcher
- Born: April 16, 1972 (age 53); La Romana, Dominican Republic
- Batted: Right Threw: Right

MLB debut
- June 17, 1997, for the Florida Marlins

Last MLB appearance
- September 23, 2007, for the Philadelphia Phillies

MLB statistics
- Win–loss record: 35–37
- Earned run average: 4.11
- Strikeouts: 400
- Saves: 129
- Stats at Baseball Reference

Teams
- Florida Marlins (1997–2001); Chicago Cubs (2002–2003); Atlanta Braves (2004); Florida Marlins (2005); Texas Rangers (2006); Philadelphia Phillies (2007)

Career highlights and awards
- World Series champion (1997); NL Rolaids Relief Man Award (2000); NL saves leader (2000)

Antonio Alfonseca (/ælfɒnˈseɪkə/; Spanish pronunciation: [anˈtonjo alfonˈseka]; born April 16, 1972) is a Dominican former professional baseball relief pitcher. He played in Major League Baseball (MLB) for the Florida Marlins (1997–2001, 2005), Chicago Cubs (2002–2003), Atlanta Braves (2004), Texas Rangers (2006), and Philadelphia Phillies (2007).

He is known for having an extra digit on each hand and foot.

== Biography ==
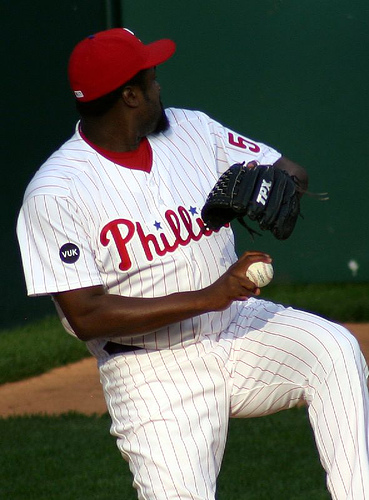
Alfonseca is known for having six fingers on each hand

Alfonseca was originally signed by the Montreal Expos as a non-drafted free agent in July 1989. On December 13, 1993, he was taken by the Florida Marlins from the Montreal Expos in the 1993 expansion draft. He made his debut during the 1997 season, and his rookie campaign saw him win a World Series ring with the Marlins. His best year was in 2000 with the Marlins, when he led the National League in saves with 45, and won the National League Rolaids Relief Man of the Year.

At the end of the 2001 season, Alfonseca had surgery to repair a herniated disc. Subsequently, the Marlins asked Alfonseca to lose 15 pounds to help to relieve stress on his back. At a weigh-in during 2002 spring training, Alfonseca had a confrontation with Dale Torborg, the son of then manager Jeff Torborg, and a former professional wrestler. While the Marlins denied any connection, shortly afterwards, on March 27, 2002, he was traded, along with Matt Clement, to the Chicago Cubs for Julián Tavárez, Ryan Jorgensen, Dontrelle Willis, and minor league pitcher Jose Cueto.

On September 2, 2003, while with the Cubs, Alfonseca was thrown out of a game for bumping an umpire with his stomach. He was subsequently suspended for five games.

After the 2004 season, he filed for free agency, and signed back with the Marlins, but in July 2005, he suffered a right elbow injury and missed the rest of the season. He was released by the Marlins, signed with the Rangers, but after another mid-season elbow injury was released by them. He pitched for the Phillies in 2007 and for the Lancaster Barnstormers and Bridgeport Bluefish of the Atlantic League from 2009 to 2011.

== Personal life ==
His nicknames are El Pulpo ("The Octopus"), The Dragonslayer, and Six-Fingers. He has six fingers on each hand and six toes on each foot, a condition known as polydactyly. His grandfather also had this trait. Alfonseca regards it with pride, as a kind of family emblem.

Alfonseca and his wife Rocío have two sons: Antonio, Jr. and Mark Anthony, and two daughters, Jenitza and Asia.

== See also ==
- List of Major League Baseball annual saves leaders
