= Scott Sullivan (baseball) =

American baseball player (born 1971)

- Pitcher
- Born: March 13, 1971 (age 55); Tuscaloosa, Alabama, U.S.
- Batted: Right Threw: Right

MLB debut
- May 6, 1995, for the Cincinnati Reds

Last MLB appearance
- August 25, 2004, for the Kansas City Royals

MLB statistics
- Win–loss record: 40–28
- Earned run average: 3.98
- Strikeouts: 622
- Stats at Baseball Reference

Teams
- Cincinnati Reds (1995–2003); Chicago White Sox (2003); Kansas City Royals (2004)

William Scott Sullivan (born March 13, 1971) is an American former professional baseball player. He played as a right-handed pitcher in Major League Baseball between 1995 and 2004.

Born in Alabama, he played high school baseball in Pickens County, Alabama with Terry Pearson. He played college baseball at Auburn University for the Auburn Tigers.

From 1996–2003, Sullivan was one of the Cincinnati Reds's most durable relief pitchers, and was looked upon as a clubhouse leader. He set a club record by pitching at least 100 innings of relief every season from 1998-2001. His best season came in 1999, a year in which the Reds won 96 games but did not make the postseason after losing a one-game playoff to the New York Mets. That season, Sullivan set or tied career highs in saves (3), appearances (79), innings pitched (113.2) and ERA (3.01).

Sullivan used a unique sidearm delivery when pitching. Like many "submarine pitchers" (as they're sometimes called), he developed back problems, which resulted in multiple trips to the disabled list toward the end of his career. He made one last comeback attempt in 2005, pitching in two games for the Omaha Royals before retiring. He currently has 3 children.
