= 1998 Houston Astros season =

37th season in Major League Baseball for the Houston Astros

1998 Houston Astros
- National League Central champions
- League: National League
- Division: Central
- Ballpark: Astrodome
- City: Houston, Texas
- Record: 102–60 (.630)
- Divisional place: 1st
- Owners: Drayton McLane, Jr.
- General managers: Gerry Hunsicker
- Managers: Larry Dierker
- Television: KNWS-TV 51 (Bill Brown, Milo Hamilton, Jim Deshaies); Fox Sports Southwest (Bill Brown, Milo Hamilton, Jim Deshaies, Bill Worrell)
- Radio: KILT–AM 610 (Milo Hamilton, Alan Ashby); KXYZ–AM 1320 (Francisco Ernesto Ruiz, Alex Treviño)

The 1998 Houston Astros season was the 37th season for the Major League Baseball (MLB) franchise located in Houston, Texas, their 34th as the Astros, 37th in the National League (NL), fifth in the NL Central division, and 34th at The Astrodome. The Astros entered the season having captured their first-ever NL Central division crown with an 84–78 record and fourth division title overall; however, their season ended in a National League Division Series (NLDS) sweep by the Atlanta Braves.

On March 31, pitcher Shane Reynolds made his third consecutive Opening Day start for the Astros, who hosted the San Francisco Giants but were defeated, 9–4. In the amateur draft, the Astros' first round selection was pitcher Brad Lidge at 17th overall, and in the ninth round, they chose third baseman Morgan Ensberg.

Left fielder Moisés Alou and second baseman Craig Biggio both represented the Astros at the MLB All-Star Game, playing for the National League. It was the third career selection for Alou, and seventh for Biggio. Right-hander Don Sutton, who pitched two seasons for the Astros, was inducted into the Baseball Hall of Fame. Moments before the trade deadline on July 31, the Astros acquired Randy Johnson from the Seattle Mariners, and proceeded to win 10 of his 11 starts.

Having attained 50 doubles and 50 stolen bases, Biggio joined Tris Speaker (1912) as the only Major Leaguers to reach both milestones during the same season. Biggio also became the ninth major leaguer to join the 20–50 club; moreover, he became the first Major Leaguer achieve each of 200 hits, 20 home runs, 50 doubles, and 50 stolen bases within the same season. Jeff Bagwell became just the second Major Leaguer to record three successive campaigns of each of 100 runs scored, 30 doubles, 30 home runs, 100 runs batted in (RBI) and 100 base on balls (BB). (Note: Trailing only Lou Gehrig.) Meanwhile, Johnson, who led the Major Leagues in strikeouts (329), became the seventh hurler since 1900 to record multiple 300-strikeout campaigns.

On the strength of a then-club record 102 wins, the Astros rocketed to a second consecutive NL Central division title and trip to the playoffs. Their fifth division title, it was the first time since the 1980 to 1981 campaigns that Houston prevailed with successive division titles. Moreover, in their second-to-last season at the Astrodome, the team drew a then-club record 2.45 million fans. In the National League Division Series (NLDS), the Astros were defeated in four games by the San Diego Padres, the NL pennant winners.

Following the season, Alou (second) and Biggio (fifth) each received Silver Slugger Awards. Larry Dierker won two Manager of the Year Awards, one from Baseball America, and another from the BBWAA (Note: Recognized one Manager of the Year for each of the NL and the American League (AL).), the second Astro to win the latter award. The Sporting News named general manager Gerry Hunsicker their Executive of the Year, also the second Astro to receive this award.

== Offseason ==
The Astros concluded the 1997 campaign as National League (NL) Central division champions, their first title in this division inaugurated in 1994, fourth overall, and first since 1986 as members of the NL West division. The Astros' campaign concluded via sweep by the Atlanta Braves in the best-of-five National League Division Series (NLDS). With 43 home runs and 31 stolen bases, first baseman Jeff Bagwell produced the first 30–30 season in franchise history, while Craig Biggio scored a then-club record 146 runs, (Note: Surpassed by Bagwell in 2000.) the highest mark in the Major Leagues since Ted Williams (American League) in 1950, and highest by a National Leaguer since Chuck Klein in 1932.

With the introduction of two expansion teams, the Arizona Diamondbacks, and the Tampa Bay Devil Rays, the league held a draft on November 18, 1997, to assist the fledgling franchises in filling out their major league rosters. Three Astros were chosen, including outfielder Bobby Abreu, by the Devil Rays, with the sixth slot in the draft. Houston left Abreu unprotected in favor of retaining another young outfielder, fellow Venezuelan Richard Hidalgo, on the major league roster. Within four hours of obtaining Abreu, Tampa Bay dealt him to the Philadelphia Phillies in a trade for shortstop Kevin Stocker.

- November 11, 1997: Traded pitchers Manuel Barrios and Óscar Henríquez and a player to be named later to the Florida Marlins for outfielder Moisés Alou. (Note: A member of the Alou family, he joined uncle Jesús, an outfielder (1969–1973, 1978, and 1979), and cousin José Sosa, a pitcher (1975–1976), to have played in the major leagues for the Astros.) Houston sent pitcher Mark Johnson to Florida on December 16, 1997, to complete the transaction.
- December 22, 1997: Signed free agent outfielder Rob Butler.

== Regular season ==
=== Summary ===
==== March—April ====
Opening Day starting lineup
| Uniform | Player | Position |
|---|---|---|
| 7 | Craig Biggio | Second baseman |
| 14 | Derek Bell | Right fielder |
| 5 | Jeff Bagwell | First baseman |
| 17 | Sean Berry | Third baseman |
| 18 | Moisés Alou | Left fielder |
| 16 | Richard Hidalgo | Center fielder |
| 12 | Ricky Gutiérrez | Shortstop |
| 11 | Brad Ausmus | Catcher |
| 37 | Shane Reynolds | Pitcher |
Venue: Astrodome • Final: San Francisco 9, Houston 4 Sources:

The Astros hosted the San Francisco Giants for Opening Day, March 31, only to be bested in a wild, extra innings affair, 9–4, Led by future Astro Jeff Kent, he exploded for five-hits and four runs batted in (RBI), starting with a three-run home run off Astros' starting pitcher Shane Reynolds to cap the top of the third inning. In the top of the 13th, Rey Sánchez singled with Charlie Hayes aboard, and Alex Diaz delivered the go-ahead single to score Sánchez as five Giants crossed the dish. Derek Bell swatted four hits, three doubles, and two RBI for Houston. C. J. Nitkowski aborted the loss. The three two-baggers represented a career high for Bell, while forging his 13th career four-hit game. Second baseman Craig Biggio became the third player to make 10 Opening Day starts for the Astros, joining César Cedeño (1981) and José Cruz (1986—11 total). Reynolds made this third Opening Day start.

Starting April 17 until June 3, Craig Biggio reached base in each of 41 consecutive games spanning the second-longest in franchise history, trailing Jimmy Wynn (1969) and Greg Gross (1975), tied at 52. During the streak, Biggio hit for a .331 batting average, .425 on-base percentage (OBP) and .548 slugging percentage (SLG), garnering 52 hits and 19 bases on balls (BB). Wynn first set the record from June 4–August 3, 1969, while Gross reached from June 25–August 18, 1975. The NL record spanned 58 games, achieved by Duke Snider, who reached base each game from May 13–July 11, 1954, for the Brooklyn Dodgers.

On April 24, Carl Everett became the fifth Astro to connect for a switch-hit, multi-home run game. (Note: Succeeded Ken Caminiti on July 3, 1994)

==== May ====
Rookie right-hander Kerry Wood, making just his fifth major league start for the Chicago Cubs on May 6, made history at the Astros' expense, striking out 20 in a one-hit, 2–0 complete game shutout victory at Wrigley Field. Wood's performance tied Roger Clemens for the major league strikeout record in a 9-inning game, while setting the National League record. Craig Biggio's spot as the leadoff hitter was the only place in the batting order which fell victim to fewer than two strikeouts, with one, and he also reached base on a hit by pitch. Only Jeff Bagwell and Jack Howell struck out as many as three times. The only hit that Wood yielded was a single to Ricky Gutiérrez to lead off the third inning. Shane Reynolds (2–3) fired an eight-inning complete game in the losing effort, scattered eight hits with just one of two runs earned and struck out 10.

The left-hander Randy Johnson from the Seattle Mariners had become the biggest trade target of the 1998 mid-season playoff race, as the Mariners were apparently out of contention by Memorial Day, and he was destined to become a free agent following the season. However, the Astros were not estimated to be major candidates to acquire the extraordinary southpaw. Meanwhile, general manager Gerry Hunsicker envisioned Johnson as a weapon against the left-handed heavy New York Yankees lineup in a hypothetical World Series matchup, who were on their way to one of the all-time greatest regular seasons in major league history, and second-most wins in the modern era, accumulating a record of 114–48 (.704). Johnson completely dominated lefties, holding them to a .156 batting average against over four subsequent Cy Young Award-winning seasons from 1999 to 2002. Further, acquiring Johnson meant keeping him away from the Yankees, as well the Los Angeles Dodgers, both heavily rumored as favorites. A trade agreement with Hunsicker's counterpart in Seattle, Woody Woodward, required a high prospect package, starting with right-hander Freddy García, shortstop Carlos Guillén and another who would be a player to be named later. For weeks initially, Hunsicker balked on making the deal.

Hunsicker noted apprehension that he would be "paying too much" for Johnson. Both García and Guillén later became multiple-time All-Stars with lengthy major league careers. García took on a large role in Seattle's starting rotation the following year, including placing second in the American League (AL) Rookie of the Year balloting. (Note: In fact, after having moved on from the Mariners, García became part of the vaunted Chicago White Sox rotation that stymied the Astros hitters during their sweep in the 2005 World Series, the year after Hunsicker was fired. His first World Series experience finally arrived in 2017 while serving as a special assistant for the Dodgers, who played against the Astros and wound up losing that World Series. Moreover, in addition to winning the four Cy Youngs after signing with the Arizona Diamondbacks, Johnson won the 2001 World Series, where he was named co-MVP after leading the Diamondbacks to the title against the New York Yankees.) Guillen was solid for the Mariners, but took longer to blossom, peaking after he was traded by Seattle prior to the 2004 season to the Detroit Tigers. Further, the Astros would be unable to extend Johnson or resign him in free agency during the off-season.

From May 25 to 31, Moisés Alou batted .579 / .667 on-base percentage (OBP) / 1.211 slugging percentage (SLG) over six games. Alou had 2 doubles, 2 triples, 2 home runs, 9 RBI, and 5 BB. Alou earned NL Player of the Week honors for May 31, following Derek Bell on August 24, 1997, as the most recent Astros. Alou last won the award for June 12, 1994, as a member of the Montreal Expos.

==== June—July ====
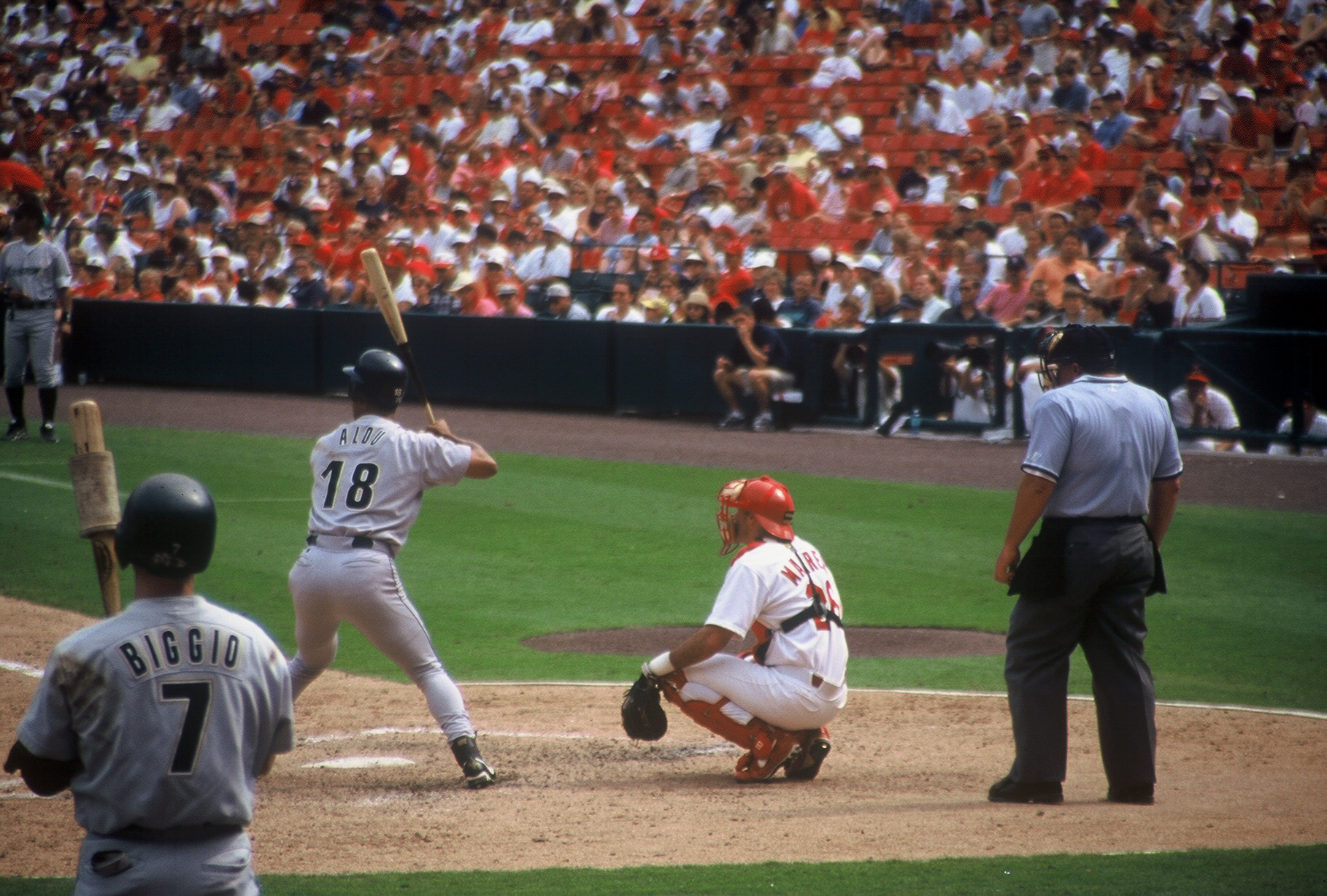
Moisés Alou (18) bats while Craig Biggio (7) waits in the on-deck circle.

Just one week after Biggio's historic on-base streak ended, on June 10, Jeff Bagwell commenced his own long streak of reaching base, lasting until July 29. A grand total of 44 consecutive games, this displaced Biggio's 41-game streak for second place in team history. Bagwell proceeded to hit .282, .411 OBP and .595 SLG, including collecting 46 hits and drawing 33 walks.

An error in the ninth inning on June 14 by Cincinnati Reds shortstop Barry Larkin allowed the Astros to tie the game. Houston proceeded to score five more runs, resulting in a 6–3 win in the tenth inning.

Facing a 5–3 deficit going into the ninth inning on June 17, Bagwell connected for a two-run home run to tie the score. Brad Ausmus singled in the game-winning run, and C. J. Nitkowski got the victory, his second of the year.

==== MLB All-Star Game ====
Moisés Alou participated in the Home Run Derby. He lasted through the first round only, hitting seven home runs and placing fifth overall. Ken Griffey Jr won the tournament with a record-tying 19 home runs.

Biggio and Alou were selected to play for the National League at the All-Star Game, hosted at Coors Field in Denver. It was Alou's first selection as an Astro and the third overall in his career. (Note: Previously selected to the 1994 and 1997 Midsummer Classics.) Meanwhile, Biggio extended his club record to seven All-Star Games. Voted as the starting second baseman for the fourth consecutive contest, this extended another club record for starts any position. (Note: Jose Altuve equaled Biggio with four consecutive starts at the All-Star Game—also at second base—from 2015—2018.)

==== July, post All-Star break ====
On July 14, closer Billy Wagner recorded his first Major League hit. During the bottom of the eighth frame, Wagner singled to right field off Aaron Small of the Arizona Diamondbacks at Bank One Ballpark. Wagner worked 1 1/3 scoreless innings, and struck out three of four batters faced to polish off a 4–2 Astros win and collect the save (22). Starter Shane Reynolds (12–5) earned the victory, whiffed seven, while scattering five hits and two runs over 7 2/3 innings. Derek Bell and Moisés Alou both went deep off Diamondbacks starter Omar Daal.

Wagner was struck on the head by a batted ball on July 15, felling the southpaw. While attempting to protect an 8–7 margin over Arizona, Kelly Stinnett's line drive struck Wagner on the left temple, rendering him motionless for several moments. Wagner remained alert and conscious, was taken to a neurological center, and later cleared of any remaining symptoms. The Diamondbacks later rallied for a 9–8 victory in 11 innings. The team withheld Wagner from game play until August 9 while he recovered.

==== Don Sutton's Hall of Fame induction ====
On July 28, right-hander Don Sutton, who pitched for the Astros during the 1981 and 1982 seasons, was inducted into the National Baseball Hall of Fame and Museum on July 28. During the 1981 season, his performance was instrumental in the Astros securing a playoff berth against his former team, the Los Angeles Dodgers. On July 7, 1982, Sutton earned his 250th career victory, a 5–1 triumph over the Chicago Cubs. The right-hander was honored primarily based on his achievements while pitching for the Dodgers.

Sutton became the second former Astro to be inducted into the Hall of Fame over consecutive seasons, succeeding Nellie Fox in 1997, and sixth overall.

==== Rest of July ====
Moments before the trade deadline on July 31, Houston acquired Johnson from the Mariners. Though he concluded the Seattle chapter of his career with a 4.33 ERA, going 9-10 prior to the deal, Johnson recaptured his previous dominant form and left Mariner fans with some solid memories. On July 11 and 16, Johnson hurled consecutive shutouts over the Anaheim Angels and Minnesota Twins, yielding six hits while fanning 26 hitters. Despite not pitching in the American League (AL) after the month of July, Johnson ranked third in the league in strikeouts (213) and fifth in complete games (6) at season's end, and ended up just two innings short of qualifying for rate statistics (160 IP).

==== August ====
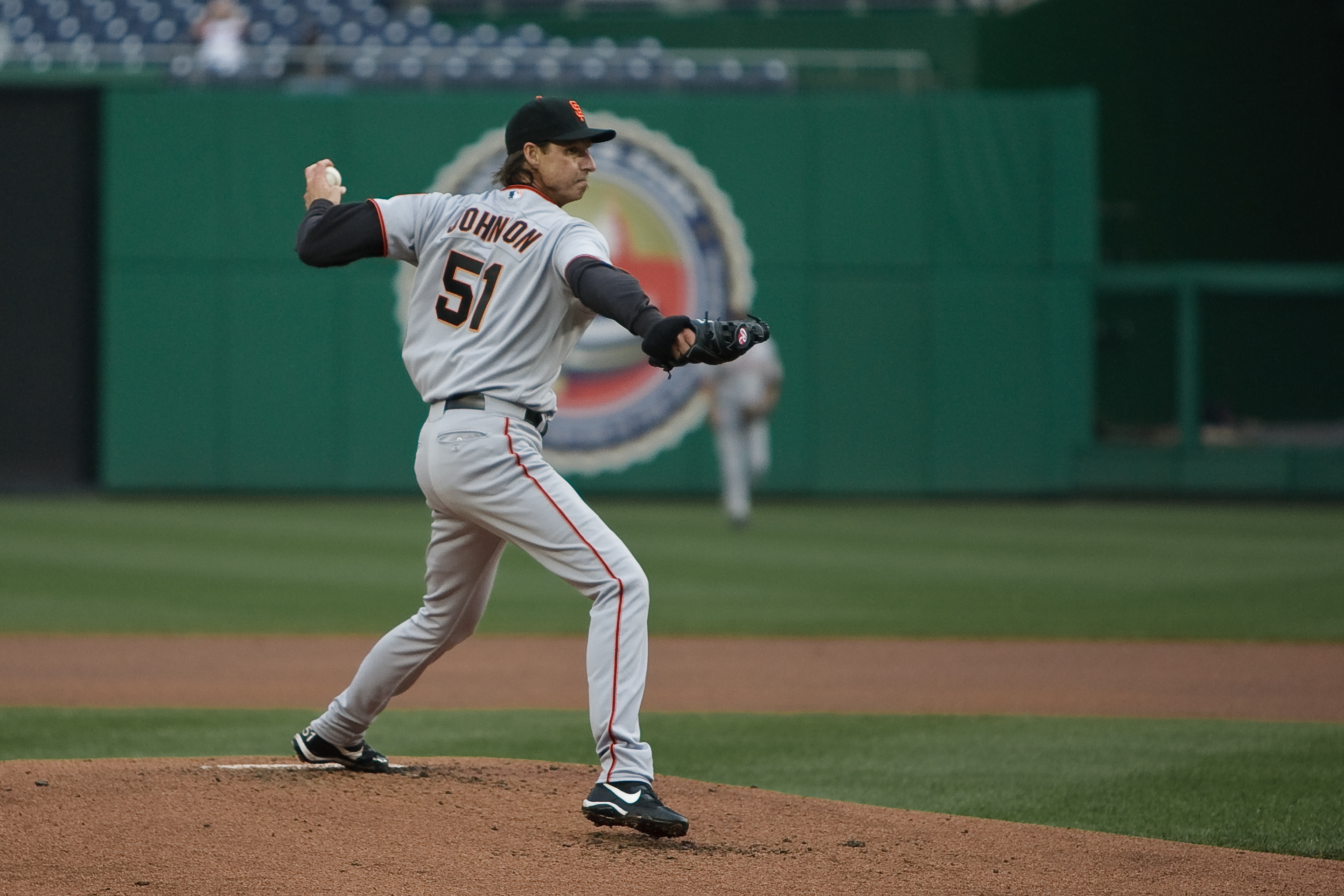
Randy Johnson on the mound (pictured during tenure with the San Francisco Giants).

At the time of their trade for Johnson, the Astros occupied first place in the NL Central and led the second-place the Cubs by 3 1/2 games. Johnson made his Astros debut on August 2 at Three Rivers Stadium to face the Pittsburgh Pirates, who countered with Todd Van Poppel. The two pitchers kept it close, as Johnson lived up to his billing with 12 strikeouts, but Pittsburgh held the advantage through 7 innings, at 2–1. In the top of the eighth, the Astros scored twice before Tony Eusebio pinch hit for Johnson and doubled in Ricky Gutiérrez for the third run of the inning. Rookie Scott Elarton finished off the afternoon with two perfect innings and strikeouts number 13 and 14 for Houston pitching. Hence, Johnson won his debut with seven strong innings to lead a 6–2 Astros win.

Johnson made his debut at the Astrodome as a member of the home team on August 7 and led a 9–0 shutout of the Philadelphia Phillies before a record attendance. This was first of 3 consecutive home shutouts for Johnson. The-fifth-largest crowd to attend a regular-season contest in the Astrodome (52,071) witnessed Johnson's mastery over Philadelphia. The Astros won 30 of their first 39 games after acquiring Johnson and their division lead over Chicago swelled from 3 1/2 games to 12 1/2.

On August 9, Billy Wagner made his first mound appearance since July 15, when he was struck on the head by a line drive. Wagner hurled a scoreless final frame to seal an 11–2 triumph over Philadelphia. Moisés Alou homered (30) and drove in four. Starter Shane Reynolds (14–7) doubled and scored, while striking out 10 over eight innings.

Randy Johnson hammered a five-hit, 13-strikeout shutout of the Milwaukee Brewers on August 12, his first 13-strikeout performance as an Astro. In all, Johnson surrendered five hits and two bases on balls for a game score of 88 to lead a 3–0 triumph. Craig Biggio homered (13) and had three hits. Johnson secured a safety and his first RBI as an Astro. Two unlikely bases bandits—Richard Hidalgo and Moisés Alou—and Derek Bell each picked Milwaukee's pocket.

On August 17, Johnson lost his start to the Phillies, snapping a scoreless innings streak at 19, the longest for the year on Houston's pitching staff.

Back at the Astrodome on August 28 to host the Pirates, Johnson fired another shutout, this time for 7 hits, no bases on balls, 16 strikeouts, and a game score of 89, his highest after he was acquired by Houston. The Pirates countered with Astros killer Francisco Córdova, who was up to the challenge with another gem, remained unscathed save for a balk and two errors to push Brad Ausmus along to score the only tallies of the contest. (Note: Córdova had started and spun the first nine innings of a combined no-hitter against the Astros on July 12, 1997.) The 16 strikeouts set a Houston record for left-handers, surpassing 15 by Mike Cuellar on June 25, 1966. The most by an Astros pitcher since Nolan Ryan amassed 16 punchouts on September 9, 1987, against San Francisco, Johnson's effort was the fourth bout in club history. (Note: Prior to Ryan, Don Wilson (twice, on July 14 and September 1, 1968) had the first two by a Houston pitcher. On May 4, 2018, Gerrit Cole became the next Astros pitcher to accomplish this feat. Criteria: For single games, playing for HOU, in the regular season, requiring strikeouts ≥ 15, sorted by ascending date.)

The Astros posted the best month in franchise history, going 22–7 in August, while increasing their lead in the NL Central to 11 games. Meanwhile, Johnson was named NL Pitcher of the Month, after having gone 5–1, 1.16 ERA, and leading the NL in strikeouts (61) and shutouts (3).

==== September—October ====
On September 2, Johnson worked the winning end of a pitchers' duel opposite Greg Maddux for a 4–2 Astros' win over the Atlanta Braves, where Johnson struck out 10. Biggio, Bagwell, and Sean Berry all homered in a rare three-home run game off the Atlanta ace. (Note: It was just the second-ever three-home run game hit off Maddux, with the first having occurred less than two weeks prior, on August 23, 1998, by Los Angeles.)

Johnson authored a 14-strikeout gem on September 7, a six-hitter of Cincinnati in a 1–0 final. Derek Bell's deep blast in the bottom of the sixth augmented the all run support required to cure the finishing touches of a masterpiece. In spite of making just his eighth appearances for Houston, Johnson became the first left-hander in club history to propagate three 13-strikeout performances, surpassing Cuellar. (Note: On June 25, 1966, and June 6, 1967. Criteria: Number of games in a career player meets criteria, throws LH, playing for HOU, in the regular season, requiring strikeouts ≥ 13, sorted by ascending instances.)

Bagwell hit his first career grand slam on September 8 while tying a career-high six runs batted in (RBI) against Cincinnati in a 13–7 Astros' victory. His 218th career home run, this broke the then-longest streak among active players without having hit a grand slam.

On September 12, the Astros won their 96th game of the season, hosting the Cardinals for a 3–2 final score. Johnson was the starter and won this game as well, going seven innings with two runs allowed and 11 strikeouts, including his 300th of the season, the second time in his career achieving this milestone. (Note: Johnson recorded his first 300 strikeout season in 1993.) This win tied the 1986 team for most in franchise history.

Just one game from clinching the NL Central division title, on September 14, the Astros took a 4–2 lead headed into ninth against the New York Mets, but lost, 7–4, in 13 innings. Mike Piazza, who collected 4 hits for New York, also launched a bomb that hurtled 480 feet (150 m). However, the San Diego Padres later defeated the second-place Cubs, 4–3. Former Astro Ken Caminiti led off the eighth inning with a home run for San Diego. Hence, the Cubs' defeat gave Houston their second-consecutive division title. San Diego (95–56) pulled within a game of Atlanta and Houston (96–55) for the best record in the NL.

Meanwhile, another race transpiring in the NL Central, and the most-watched race of the summer—the home run record chase—remained deadlocked at 62 as of September 14. The Cubs' Sammy Sosa whiffed four times against the Padres, while Mark McGwire of the St. Louis Cardinals singled twice in a 7–3 victory over the Pirates.

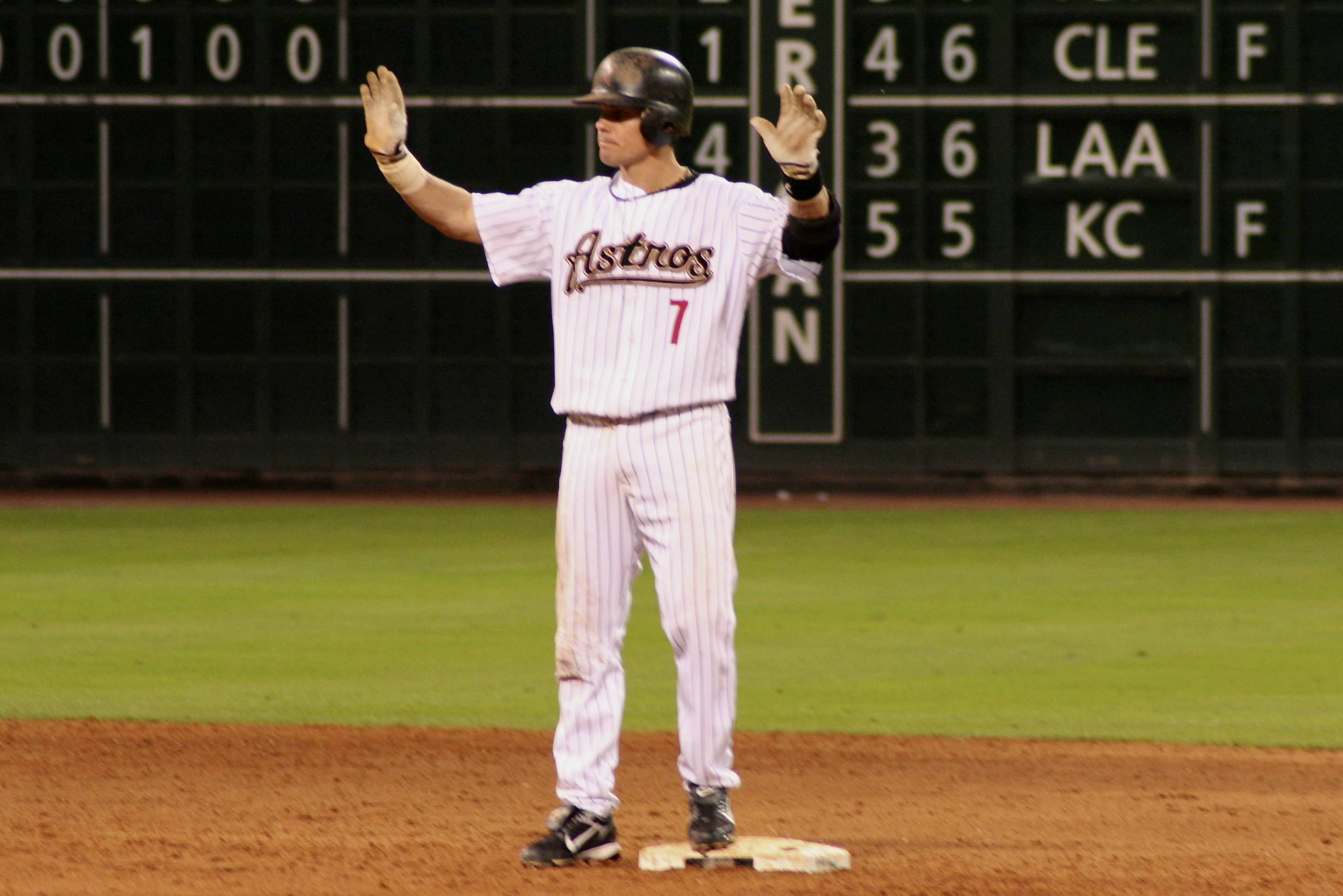
Craig Biggio joined the 20–50 club to go along with 210 hits and 51 doubles.

On September 15, Craig Biggio singled in the ninth inning of the second game of a doubleheader off Turk Wendell of the Mets for his 200th hit of the season. With the hit, Biggio become the first player in Astros history to reach this milestone. The Astros lost the second game, 8–4, after winning the first to earn the split. Biggio had passed Enos Cabell's club single-season record for hits (195), established in 1978.

At Busch Memorial Stadium on September 23, the Astros defeated St. Louis, 7–1, for their 100th win of the season, reaching the milestone for the first time in franchise history. Johnson worked 7 strong innings, allowing the only run with six walks and eight strikeouts on 136 pitches to earn his 10th win since joining Houston and 19th overall for the season. Biggio, Hidalgo, and Alou all collected three hits apiece. Biggio pilfered his 50th base of the season, by which along with 50 doubles, joined Hall of Famer Tris Speaker as the major league only players since the 20th century to have reached both milestones in the same season. Biggio became the ninth player in major league history to join the 20 home runs—50 stolen bases club, and the second Astro since César Cedeño compiled three consecutive from 1972 to 1974.

Biggio ultimately reached 210 hits for the season, which remained as the Astros' single-season record until Jose Altuve surpassed it on September 16, 2014. Biggio also surpassed Cedeño's club record for runs scored (891).

==== Performance overview ====
The Astros won a club-record 102 games en route to a second successive NL Central division title. Five starting pitchers earned double-figures in wins for Houston, including Randy Johnson's effort with the Astros after his acquisition at the July 31 trade deadline. The team drew a franchise-record 2.45 million fans in their penultimate season as tenants at the Astrodome, including 10 contests with 50,000 or more. Fans would exceed the stadium's attendance record again the following year by over 250,000.

The sixth consecutive winning season for the Astros, it signaled the fifth consecutive with a finish in either first or second place in the NL Central division—both unprecedented streaks at the time. The 1998 season was the third time the Astros won upward of 90 games, having previously achieved this in 1980 (93 wins) and 1986 (96). For the first time since 1980 and 1981, (Note: The playoff structure for 1981 season was temporarily modified as result of that year's strike, in which half-season division titles were awarded and a Division Series round was inserted.) Houston repeated both as consecutive division title winners, (Note: The Astros competed in the NL West division at the time.) and as playoff entrants.

Houston launched a franchise-record 166 home runs, surpassing the 138 they had hit in 1993. The following year, they also broke this record.

Larry Dierker was recognized with multiple Manager of the Year Awards, including National League (NL) Manager of the Year, (Note: As recognized by the Baseball Writers' Association of America (BBWAA).) and another by Baseball America, (Note: Recognizes one manager in the major leagues.) becoming the first Astros manager to win the Baseball America prize. Dierker became the second Astro to win NL Manager of the Year, joining Hal Lanier in 1986. The Sporting News further recognized general manager Gerry Hunsicker as Executive of the Year, also the second Astro to receive this award,.succeeding Tal Smith in 1980.

In addition to joining Tris Speaker as the only player to register 50 doubles and 50 stolen bases, and the ninth to join the 20–50 club, Craig Biggio became the first, and so far only, Major Leaguer to accumulate each of 200 hits, 50 doubles, 20 home runs, and 50 stolen bases all within the same season. (Note: For single seasons, in the regular season, requiring doubles ≥ 50 and home runs ≥ 20 and stolen bases ≥ 50 and hits ≥ 200, sorted by ascending season.)

Jeff Bagwell recorded the third of six successive campaigns of each of 100 runs scored, 30 doubles, 30 home runs, 100 runs batted in (RBI) and 100 base on balls (BB), which eventually became a Major League record, through 2001. As of 1998, this streak was one season behind the all-time Major League record, accomplished by Lou Gehrig. (Note: Just four other players had produced six or more total seasons meeting each of the criteria: Lou Gehrig (8); and Babe Ruth, Ted Williams, and Barry Bonds (6 each). The maximus of four consecutive was achieved by Gehrig (1929—32), leaving Bagwell one campaign behind this record as of 1998. Filtered for: Number of seasons player meets criteria, in the regular season: Requiring runs ≥ 100, doubles ≥ 30, home runs ≥ 30, runs batted in ≥ 100 and bases on balls ≥ 100, sorted by descending instances.)

Randy Johnson became the seventh pitcher since 1900 to amass multiple 300-strikeout seasons. Johnson won each of his final 7 regular season starts, surrendering 7 earned runs in 54 1/3 innings for a 1.28 ERA. Having accumulated 116 strikeouts and 4 shutouts following his acquisition by Houston, Johnson led all of baseball in both categories, 329 and 6, respectively—though not having enough to be the league leader in either the AL or NL. It was the fifth time in his career that Johnson led the major leagues in strikeouts, and wound up doing so a total of ten times during his career. Hence, Johnson became the fourth Astros pitcher whose aggregate strikeout total led all of baseball and first to change leagues mid-season. He was preceded by J. R. Richard (twice) in 1978 (303) and in 1979 (313), Mike Scott in 1986 (306), and Nolan Ryan in 1987 (270).

Following the season, Biggio was recognized with the Silver Slugger Award for the fifth time in his career, extending his club record. It was fourth at second base and he had won his first as catcher. Left fielder Moisés Alou also won the Silver Slugger during his first season in Houston and the second of his career overall. (Note: First was as a member of the Montreal Expos in 1994.)

=== League standings ===
==== National League Central ====
NL Central
| Team | W | L | Pct. | GB | Home | Road |
|---|---|---|---|---|---|---|
| Houston Astros | 102 | 60 | .630 | — | 55‍–‍26 | 47‍–‍34 |
| Chicago Cubs | 90 | 73 | .552 | 12½ | 51‍–‍31 | 39‍–‍42 |
| St. Louis Cardinals | 83 | 79 | .512 | 19 | 48‍–‍34 | 35‍–‍45 |
| Cincinnati Reds | 77 | 85 | .475 | 25 | 39‍–‍42 | 38‍–‍43 |
| Milwaukee Brewers | 74 | 88 | .457 | 28 | 38‍–‍43 | 36‍–‍45 |
| Pittsburgh Pirates | 69 | 93 | .426 | 33 | 40‍–‍40 | 29‍–‍53 |

==== Record versus opponents ====
National League

1998 National League record Source: MLB Standings Grid – 1998
| Team | AZ | ATL | CHC | CIN | COL | FLA | HOU | LAD | MIL | MON | NYM | PHI | PIT | SD | SF | STL | AL |
|---|---|---|---|---|---|---|---|---|---|---|---|---|---|---|---|---|---|
| Arizona | — | 1–8 | 5–7 | 4–5 | 6–6 | 6–2 | 4–5 | 4–8 | 6–3 | 2–7 | 4–5 | 2–7 | 6–3 | 3–9 | 5–7 | 2–7 | 5–8 |
| Atlanta | 8–1 | — | 3–6 | 7–2 | 5–3 | 7–5 | 4–5 | 8–1 | 7–2 | 6–6 | 9–3 | 8–4 | 7–2 | 5–4 | 7–2 | 6–3 | 9–7 |
| Chicago | 7–5 | 6–3 | — | 6–5 | 7–2 | 7–2 | 4–7 | 4–5 | 6–6 | 7–2 | 4–5 | 3–6 | 8–3 | 5–4 | 7–3 | 4–7 | 5–8 |
| Cincinnati | 5–4 | 2–7 | 5–6 | — | 4–5 | 9–0 | 3–8 | 5–4 | 6–5 | 8–1 | 3–6 | 4–5 | 5–7 | 1–11 | 2–7 | 8–3 | 7-6 |
| Colorado | 6–6 | 3–5 | 2–7 | 5–4 | — | 6–3 | 6–5 | 6–6 | 4–7 | 7–2 | 3–6 | 5–4 | 5–4 | 5–7 | 7–5 | 3–6 | 4–8 |
| Florida | 2–6 | 5–7 | 2–7 | 0–9 | 3–6 | — | 3–6 | 4–5 | 0–9 | 5–7 | 5–7 | 6–6 | 3–6 | 4–5 | 0–9 | 4–5 | 8–8 |
| Houston | 5–4 | 5–4 | 7–4 | 8–3 | 5–6 | 6–3 | — | 3–6 | 9–2 | 7–2 | 5–4 | 7–2 | 9–2 | 5–4 | 6–3 | 5–7 | 10–4 |
| Los Angeles | 8–4 | 1–8 | 5–4 | 4–5 | 6–6 | 5–4 | 6–3 | — | 5–4 | 5–4 | 3–5 | 5–4 | 7–5 | 5–7 | 6–6 | 4–5 | 8–5 |
| Milwaukee | 3–6 | 2–7 | 6–6 | 5–6 | 7–4 | 9–0 | 2–9 | 4–5 | — | 6–3 | 1–8 | 4–5 | 6–5 | 3–6 | 5–4 | 3–8 | 8–6 |
| Montreal | 7–2 | 6–6 | 2–7 | 1–8 | 2–7 | 7–5 | 2–7 | 4–5 | 3–6 | — | 8–4 | 5–7 | 2–7 | 4–4 | 3–6 | 3–6 | 6–10 |
| New York | 5–4 | 3–9 | 5–4 | 6–3 | 6–3 | 7–5 | 4–5 | 5–3 | 8–1 | 4–8 | — | 8–4 | 4–5 | 4–5 | 4–5 | 6–3 | 9–7 |
| Philadelphia | 7–2 | 4–8 | 6–3 | 5–4 | 4–5 | 6–6 | 2–7 | 4–5 | 5–4 | 7–5 | 4–8 | — | 8–1 | 1–8 | 2–6 | 3–6 | 7–9 |
| Pittsburgh | 3–6 | 2–7 | 3–8 | 7–5 | 4–5 | 6–3 | 2–9 | 5–7 | 5–6 | 7–2 | 5–4 | 1–8 | — | 5–4 | 2–7 | 6–5 | 6–7 |
| San Diego | 9–3 | 4–5 | 4–5 | 11–1 | 7–5 | 5–4 | 4–5 | 7–5 | 6–3 | 4–4 | 5–4 | 8–1 | 4–5 | — | 8–4 | 6–3 | 6–7 |
| San Francisco | 7–5 | 2–7 | 3–7 | 7–2 | 5–7 | 9–0 | 3–6 | 6–6 | 4–5 | 6–3 | 5–4 | 6–2 | 7–2 | 4–8 | — | 7–5 | 8–5 |
| St. Louis | 7–2 | 3–6 | 7–4 | 3–8 | 6–3 | 5-4 | 7–5 | 5–4 | 8–3 | 6–3 | 3–6 | 6–3 | 5–6 | 3–6 | 5–7 | — | 4–9 |

=== Notable transactions ===
- July 31, 1998: Randy Johnson was traded by the Seattle Mariners to the Houston Astros for a player to be named later, Freddy Garcia, and Carlos Guillén. The Houston Astros sent John Halama (October 1, 1998) to the Seattle Mariners to complete the trade.

== Roster ==
1998 Houston Astros
Roster
| Pitchers: 38 Sean Bergman; 51 José Cabrera; 50 Scott Elarton; 23 Mike Grzanich; 54 John Halama; 10 Mike Hampton; 44 Reggie Harris; 19,43 Doug Henry; 51 Randy Johnson; 42 José Lima; 52 Mike Magnante; 46 Trever Miller; 47 C. J. Nitkowski; 39 Jay Powell; 37 Shane Reynolds; 43 Bob Scanlan; 41 Pete Schourek; 13 Billy Wagner | Catchers: 11 Brad Ausmus; 20 Tony Eusebio; 4 Mitch Meluskey; Infielders: 5 Jeff Bagwell; 17 Sean Berry; 7 Craig Biggio; 27 Tim Bogar; 12 Ricky Gutiérrez; 36 Jack Howell; 9 Russ Johnson; 29 J. R. Phillips; 28 Bill Spiers | Outfielders: 18 Moisés Alou; 14 Derek Bell; 35 Dave Clark; 3 Carl Everett; 15 Richard Hidalgo; 22 Pete Incaviglia; 39 Ray Montgomery; Other batters: 31 Daryle Ward | Manager: 49 Larry Dierker; Coaches: 25 José Cruz (first base); 24 Mike Cubbage (third base); 21 Dave Engle (bullpen); 8 Matt Galante (bench); 16 Tom McCraw (hitting); 48 Vern Ruhle (pitching) |

== Game log ==
=== Regular season ===
Legend
| | Astros win |
| | Astros loss |
| | Postponement |
| | Clinched division |
| **Bold** | Astros team member |

1998 regular season game log: 102–60 (Home: 55–26; Away: 47–34)
March: 0–1 (Home: 0–1; Away: 0–0)

| # | Date | Time (CT) | Opponent | Score | Win | Loss | Save | Time of Game | Attendance | Record | Box/ Streak |
|---|---|---|---|---|---|---|---|---|---|---|---|
| 1 | March 31 | 4:06 p.m. CDT | Giants | L 4–9 (13) | Johnstone (1–0) | **Nitkowski** (0–1) | — | 4:29 | 43,776 | 0–1 | L1 |

April: 17–9 (Home: 8–3; Away: 9–6)

| # | Date | Time (CT) | Opponent | Score | Win | Loss | Save | Time of Game | Attendance | Record | Box/ Streak |
|---|---|---|---|---|---|---|---|---|---|---|---|
| 2 | April 1 | 6:37 p.m. CDT | Giants | **W** 7–6 | **Miller** (1–0) | Tavarez (0–1) | **Wagner** (1) | 3:04 | 13,719 | 1–1 | W1 |
| 3 | April 2 | 7:05 p.m. CDT | Giants | L 2–9 | Rueter (1–0) | **Halama** (0–1) | — | 3:18 | 15,040 | 1–2 | L1 |
| 4 | April 3 | 7:05 p.m. CDT | Rockies | **W** 15–2 | **Lima** (1–0) | Wright (0–1) | — | 2:47 | 26,026 | 2–2 | W1 |
| 5 | April 4 | 7:06 p.m. CDT | Rockies | L 3–5 | Thompson (1–0) | **Bergman** (0–1) | Dipoto (2) | 2:54 | 21,325 | 2–3 | L1 |
| 6 | April 5 | 1:36 p.m. CDT | Rockies | **W** 6–2 | **Reynolds** (1–0) | Kile (1–1) | — | 2:29 | 21,037 | 3–3 | W1 |
| 7 | April 6 | 12:37 p.m. CDT | Rockies | **W** 13–4 | **Hampton** (1–0) | Thomson (1–1) | — | 2:51 | 13,553 | 4–3 | W2 |
| 8 | April 7 | 3:11 p.m. CDT | @ Giants | L 4–5 (10) | Nen (1–0) | **Wagner** (0–1) | — | 3:38 | 55,370 | 4–4 | L1 |
| 9 | April 8 | 9:05 p.m. CDT | @ Giants | **W** 6–3 | **Lima** (2–0) | Rueter (1–1) | **Wagner** (2) | 3:02 | 10,021 | 5–4 | W1 |
| 10 | April 9 | 9:04 p.m. CDT | @ Giants | **W** 3–1 | **Bergman** (1–1) | Gardner (1–1) | **Nitkowski** (1) | 2:54 | 10,153 | 6–4 | W2 |
| 11 | April 10 | 9:07 p.m. CDT | @ Dodgers | L 2–7 | Martínez (2–1) | **Reynolds** (1–1) | — | 2:51 | 34,994 | 6–5 | L1 |
| 12 | April 11 | 9:07 p.m. CDT | @ Dodgers | **W** 6–2 | **Hampton** (2–0) | Dreifort (0–1) | **Henry** (1) | 2:27 | 40,037 | 7–5 | W1 |
| 13 | April 12 | 7:08 p.m. CDT | @ Dodgers | L 6–7 (10) | Osuna (1–0) | **Wagner** (0–2) | — | 3:27 | 33,429 | 7–6 | L1 |
| 14 | April 13 | 7:05 p.m. CDT | @ Dodgers | L 1–3 | Nomo (1–1) | **Lima** (2–1) | Radinsky (2) | 2:14 | 32,289 | 7–7 | L2 |
| 15 | April 15 | 6:12 p.m. CDT | @ Reds | L 1–4 | Tomko (2–1) | **Reynolds** (1–2) | Shaw (4) | 2:28 | 15,619 | 7–8 | L3 |
| 16 | April 16 | 6:30 p.m. CDT | @ Reds | **W** 7–4 | **Hampton** (3–0) | Weathers (1–1) | **Wagner** (3) | 3:02 | 14,596 | 8–8 | W1 |
| 17 | April 17 | 7:06 p.m. CDT | Expos | **W** 5–3 | **Halama** (1–1) | Hermanson (1–2) | **Wagner** (4) | 2:31 | 26,485 | 9–8 | W2 |
| 18 | April 18 | 7:05 p.m. CDT | Expos | **W** 4–3 | **Henry** (1–0) | Batista (0–1) | — | 2:55 | 29,362 | 10–8 | W3 |
| 19 | April 19 | 1:37 p.m. CDT | Expos | L 4–5 | Telford (2–0) | **Magnante** (0–1) | Urbina (4) | 2:57 | 18,484 | 10–9 | L1 |
| 20 | April 21 | | @ Mets | 6–0 | **Hampton** (4–0) | Reed (1–2) | — | 2:38 | 14,774 | 11–9 | W1 |
| 21 | April 22 | | @ Mets | 7–10 | Cook (2–0) | **Henry** (1–1) | — | 3:41 | 12,772 | 11–10 | L1 |
| – | April 23 | | @ Mets | **Postponed (Rain)** (Makeup date: April 27) | | | | | | | |
| 22 | April 24 | 6:07 p.m. CDT | @ Expos | **W** 8–4 | **Lima** (3–1) | Valdes (0–3) | — | 2:49 | 8,713 | 12–10 | W1 |
| 23 | April 25 | 6:08 p.m. CDT | @ Expos | **W** 4–3 | **Magnante** (1–1) | Urbina (1–1) | **Wagner** (5) | 3:11 | 8,489 | 13–10 | W2 |
| 24 | April 26 | 12:38 p.m. CDT | @ Expos | **W** 15–0 | **Bergman** (2–1) | Moore (1–3) | **iller** (1) | 2:49 | 9,889 | 14–10 | W3 |
| 25 | April 27 | | @ Mets | 4–3 | **Nitkowski** (1–1) | Franco (0–1) | **Wagner** (6) | 2:30 | 17,656 | 15–10 | W4 |
| 26 | April 28 | | Mets | 4–3 (10) | **Magnante** (2–1) | Hudek (0–1) | — | 3:43 | 14,943 | 16–10 | W5 |
| 27 | April 29 | | Mets | 6–1 | **Lima** (4–1) | Mlicki (0–3) | — | 2:26 | 14,448 | 17–10 | W6 |

May: 16–12 (Home: 8–6; Away: 8–6)

| # | Date | Time (CT) | Opponent | Score | Win | Loss | Save | Time of Game | Attendance | Record | Box/ Streak |
|---|---|---|---|---|---|---|---|---|---|---|---|
| 28 | May 1 | | @ Phillies | 12–5 | **Reynolds** (2–2) | Beech (0–2) | — | 3:17 | 11,410 | 18–10 | W7 |
| 29 | May 2 | | @ Phillies | 4–1 | **Hampton** (5–0) | Schilling (3–3) | **Wagner** (7) | 2:39 | 18,766 | 19–10 | W8 |
| 30 | May 3 | | @ Phillies | 3–5 | Gomes (1–0) | **Bergman** (2–2) | Leiter (2) | 2:52 | 21,288 | 19–11 | L1 |
| 31 | May 5 | | @ Cubs | 10–5 | **Lima** (5–1) | Clark (2–4) | **Nitkowski** (2) | 2:44 | 21,431 | 20–11 | W1 |
| 32 | May 6 | | @ Cubs | 0–2 | Wood (3–2) | **Reynolds** (2–3) | — | 2:19 | 15,758 | 20–12 | L1 |
| 33 | May 8 | | @ Brewers | 1–4 | Juden (4–1) | **Hampton** (5–1) | Jones (10) | 2:42 | 14,711 | 20–13 | L2 |
| 34 | May 9 | | @ Brewers | 11–6 | **Schourek** (1–0) | Eldred (0–2) | — | 3:23 | 20,145 | 21–13 | W1 |
| 35 | May 10 | | @ Brewers | 7–1 | **Lima** (6–1) | Woodard (2–1) | — | 2:33 | 19,023 | 22–13 | W2 |
| 36 | May 11 | | Marlins | 5–2 | **Reynolds** (3–3) | Hernandez (2–3) | **Wagner** (8) | 2:50 | 14,110 | 23–13 | W3 |
| 37 | May 12 | | Marlins | 4–2 | **Bergman** (3–2) | Hammond (0–1) | **Wagner** (9) | 2:38 | 14,919 | 24–13 | W4 |
| 38 | May 13 | | Pirates | 1–0 | **Hampton** (6–1) | Lieber (1–5) | **Wagner** (10) | 2:16 | 14,239 | 25–13 | W5 |
| 39 | May 14 | | Pirates | 2–7 | Silva (4–3) | **Schourek** (1–1) | — | 2:36 | 16,123 | 25–14 | L1 |
| 40 | May 15 | | Braves | 2–3 | Neagle (5–1) | **Lima** (6–2) | Martinez (1) | 2:23 | 38,941 | 25–15 | L2 |
| 41 | May 16 | | Braves | 3–2 | **Henry** (2–1) | Lightenberg (3–2) | — | 2:34 | 51,526 | 26–15 | W1 |
| 42 | May 17 | | Braves | 8–1 | **Bergman** (4–2) | Smoltz (4–1) | — | 2:29 | 35,250 | 27–15 | W2 |
| 43 | May 18 | | Braves | 0–4 | Glavine (6–2) | **Hampton** (6–2) | — | 2:47 | 22,119 | 27–16 | L1 |
| 44 | May 19 | 6:06 p.m. CDT | @ Expos | L 2–4 | Perez (3–3) | **Schourek** (1–2) | Urbina (10) | 2:36 | 9,126 | 27–17 | L2 |
| 45 | May 20 | 6:06 p.m. CDT | @ Expos | **W** 4–3 | **Henry** (3–1) | Telford (2–1) | **Wagner** (11) | 2:49 | 8,372 | 28–17 | W1 |
| 46 | May 21 | 12:37 p.m. CDT | @ Expos | **W** 6–0 | **Reynolds** (4–3) | Bennett (1–2) | — | 2:55 | 7,601 | 29–17 | W2 |
| 47 | May 22 | | Padres | 6–9 | Miceli (4–1) | **Nitkowski** (1–2) | Hoffman (14) | 3:12 | 28,550 | 29–18 | L1 |
| 48 | May 23 | | Padres | 4–3 | **Miller** (2–0) | Miceli (4–2) | **Wagner** (12) | 2:53 | 36,281 | 30–18 | W1 |
| 49 | May 24 | | Padres | 5–2 | **Schourek** (2–2) | Hamilton (3–5) | **Wagner** (13) | 3:02 | 25,701 | 31–18 | W2 |
| 50 | May 25 | 3:07 p.m. CDT | Dodgers | L 3–4 (10) | Bruske (1–0) | **Scanlan** (0–1) | Radinsky (9) | 3:35 | 34,079 | 31–19 | L1 |
| 51 | May 26 | 7:06 p.m. CDT | Dodgers | **W** 13–2 | **Reynolds** (5–3) | Valdéz (4–6) | — | 2:34 | 16,251 | 32–19 | W1 |
| 52 | May 27 | 6:37 p.m. CDT | Dodgers | L 1–3 | Dreifort (3–4) | **Bergman** (4–3) | Radinsky (10) | 2:50 | 17,190 | 32–20 | L1 |
| 53 | May 29 | 8:05 p.m. CDT | @ Rockies | **W** 7–6 | **Hampton** (7–2) | Astacio (4–7) | **Wagner** (14) | 2:59 | 48,325 | 33–20 | W1 |
| 54 | May 30 | 3:06 p.m. CDT | @ Rockies | L 3–6 | Thomson (4–5) | **Schourek** (2–3) | Dipoto (12) | 2:55 | 48,036 | 33–21 | L1 |
| 55 | May 31 | 2:06 p.m. CDT | @ Rockies | L 5–7 | McElroy (1–1) | **Henry** (3–2) | — | 2:40 | 48,097 | 33–22 | L2 |

June: 17–10 (Home: 8–4; Away: 9–6)

| # | Date | Time (CT) | Opponent | Score | Win | Loss | Save | Time of Game | Attendance | Record | Box/ Streak |
|---|---|---|---|---|---|---|---|---|---|---|---|
| 56 | June 2 | | @ Padres | 4–3 | **Reynolds** (6–3) | Reyes (2–2) | **Wagner** (15) | 2:43 | 15,735 | 34–22 | W1 |
| 57 | June 3 | | @ Padres | 8–2 | **Bergman** (5–3) | Hamilton (3–7) | — | 2:43 | 13,229 | 35–22 | W2 |
| 58 | June 4 | | @ Padres | 1–5 | Ashby (7–4) | **Hampton** (7–3) | — | 2:24 | 21,027 | 35–23 | L1 |
| 59 | June 5 | | Royals | 0–3 | Belcher (5–6) | **Schourek** (2–4) | Montgomery (10) | 2:36 | 27,895 | 35–24 | L2 |
| 60 | June 6 | | Royals | 6–0 | **Lima** (7–2) | Rosado (1–5) | — | 2:28 | 25,516 | 36–24 | W1 |
| 61 | June 7 | | Royals | 7–1 | **Reynolds** (7–3) | Pittsley (0–1) | — | 2:33 | 23,228 | 37–24 | W2 |
| 62 | June 8 | | @ Tigers | 9–5 | **Henry** (4–2) | Jones (0–2) | — | 3:28 | 11,767 | 38–24 | W3 |
| 63 | June 9 | | @ Tigers | 5–3 | **Hampton** (8–3) | Jones (0–3) | **Wagner** (16) | 2:43 | 10,871 | 39–24 | W4 |
| 64 | June 10 | | @ Tigers | 10–3 | **Schourek** (3–4) | Castillo (2–5) | — | 2:35 | 11,471 | 40–24 | W5 |
| 65 | June 12 | 6:05 p.m. CDT | @ Reds | L 1–8 | Remlinger (4–7) | **Lima** (7–3) | — | 2:23 | 21,310 | 40–25 | L1 |
| 66 | June 13 | 6:05 p.m. CDT | @ Reds | L 4–7 | Klingenbeck (1–1) | **Reynolds** (7–4) | Shaw (18) | 2:50 | 28,055 | 40–26 | L2 |
| 67 | June 14 | 12:15 p.m. CDT | @ Reds | **W** 6–3 (10) | **Wagner** (1–2) | Shaw (1–4) | — | 3:23 | 22,008 | 41–26 | W1 |
| 68 | June 15 | 6:06 p.m. CDT | @ Reds | **W** 13–2 | **Magnante** (3–1) | Tomko (5–6) | — | 2:56 | 14,556 | 42–26 | W2 |
| 69 | June 16 | | Cardinals | 4–9 | Acevedo (2–1) | **Schourek** (3–5) | — | 3:10 | 34,822 | 42–27 | L1 |
| 70 | June 17 | | Cardinals | 6–5 | **Nitkowski** (2–2) | Brantley (0–4) | — | 3:03 | 37,147 | 43–27 | W1 |
| 71 | June 18 | | Cardinals | 6–7 | Bottenfield (2–3) | **Reynolds** (7–5) | Croushore (1) | 3:05 | 43,806 | 43–28 | L1 |
| 72 | June 19 | 7:05 p.m. CDT | Reds | **W** 4–2 | **Bergman** (6–3) | Winchester (3–4) | **Wagner** (17) | 2:38 | 29,251 | 44–28 | W1 |
| 73 | June 20 | 12:18 p.m. CDT | Reds | **W** 9–8 | **Nitkowski** (3–2) | Krivda (2–1) | **Wagner** (18) | 3:13 | 24,301 | 45–28 | W2 |
| 74 | June 21 | 1:35 p.m. CDT | Reds | **W** 3–1 | **Schourek** (4–5) | Harnisch (6–3) | **Magnante** (1) | 2:57 | 42,281 | 46–28 | W3 |
| 75 | June 22 | 7:05 p.m. CDT | Twins | L 3–5 | Milton (4–6) | **Lima** (7–4) | Aguilera (15) | 2:42 | 23,168 | 46–29 | L1 |
| 76 | June 23 | 12:36 p.m. CDT | Twins | **W** 9–0 | **Reynolds** (8–5) | Tewksbury (4–9) | — | 2:49 | 27,157 | 47–29 | W1 |
| 77 | June 24 | 8:08 p.m. CDT | @ Rockies | L 6–8 | Astacio (5–8) | **Bergman** (6–4) | Veres (2) | 2:37 | 48,150 | 47–30 | L1 |
| 78 | June 25 | 2:06 p.m. CDT | @ Rockies | L 5–6 (12) | Leskanic (4–3) | **Magnante** (3–2) | — | 3:39 | 48,046 | 47–31 | L2 |
| 79 | June 26 | | @ Indians | 2–4 | Colon (8–4) | **Magnante** (3–3) | Jackson (17) | 2:58 | 43,222 | 47–32 | L3 |
| 80 | June 27 | | @ Indians | 9–5 (11) | **Wagner** (2–2) | Mesa (3–4) | — | 3:53 | 43,132 | 48–32 | W1 |
| 81 | June 28 | | @ Indians | 12–3 | **Reynolds** (9–5) | Nagy (7–4) | **Nitkowski** (3) | 3:12 | 43,047 | 49–32 | W2 |
| 82 | June 30 | | White Sox | 17–2 | **Bergman** (7–4) | Navarro (6–10) | — | 2:30 | 26,400 | 50–32 | W3 |

July: 15–12 (Home: 10–4; Away: 5–8)

| # | Date | Time (CT) | Opponent | Score | Win | Loss | Save | Time of Game | Attendance | Record | Box/ Streak |
|---|---|---|---|---|---|---|---|---|---|---|---|
| 83 | July 1 | | White Sox | 10–4 | **Schourek** (5–5) | Parque (2–2) | — | 2:54 | 29.050 | 51–32 | W4 |
| 84 | July 2 | | White Sox | 3–4 | Baldwin (3–3) | **Lima** (7–5) | Simas (4) | 2:25 | 25,344 | 51–33 | L1 |
| 85 | July 3 | | Diamondbacks | 6–5 | **Reynolds** (10–5) | Benes (6–9) | **Wagner** (19) | 2:56 | 34,382 | 52–33 | W1 |
| 86 | July 4 | | Diamondbacks | 4–7 | Anderson (6–7) | **Hampton** (8–4) | — | 2:50 | 31,477 | 52–34 | L1 |
| 87 | July 5 | | Diamondbacks | 5–2 | **Bergman** (8–4) | Blair (3–12) | **Wagner** (20) | 3:22 | 23,607 | 53–34 | W1 |
**69th All-Star Game in Denver, Colorado**
| 88 | July 9 | | @ Cardinals | 5–4 | **Reynolds** (11–5) | Stottlemyre (9–7) | **Wagner** (21) | 2:52 | 34,398 | 54–34 | W2 |
| 89 | July 10 | | @ Cardinals | 3–6 | King (2–0) | **Nitkowski** (3–3) | Brantley (13) | 2:31 | 44,655 | 54–35 | L1 |
| 90 | July 11 | | @ Cardinals | 3–4 (11) | Painter (3–0) | **Wagner** (2–3) | — | 3:01 | 45,760 | 54–36 | L2 |
| 91 | July 12 | | @ Cardinals | 4–6 | Acevedo (4–2) | **Bergman** (8–5) | Croushore (4) | 2:42 | 45,485 | 54–37 | L3 |
| 92 | July 13 | | @ Diamondbacks | 3–5 | Telemaco (3–3) | **Schourek** (5–6) | Olson (12) | 2:53 | 40,007 | 54–38 | L4 |
| 93 | July 14 | | @ Diamondbacks | 4–2 | **Reynolds** (12–5) | Daal (3–5) | **Wagner** (22) | 2:45 | 40,419 | 55–38 | W1 |
| 94 | July 15 | | @ Diamondbacks | 8–9 (11) | Embree (3–0) | **Magnante** (3–4) | — | 4:00 | 42,229 | 55–39 | L1 |
| 95 | July 17 | 7:06 p.m. CDT | Giants | **W** 10–7 | **Lima** (8–5) | Rueter (10–5) | — | 2:44 | 40,709 | 56–39 | W1 |
| 96 | July 18 | 3:07 p.m. CDT | Giants | **W** 7–2 | **Bergman** (9–5) | Darwin (6–7) | — | 2:43 | 35,257 | 57–39 | W2 |
| 97 | July 19 | 1:35 p.m. CDT | Giants | **W** 4–3 (12) | **Henry** (5–2) | Nen (6–2) | — | 3:47 | 32,900 | 58–39 | W3 |
| 98 | July 20 | 7:05 p.m. CDT | Rockies | **W** 10–9 | **Henry** (6–2) | Veres (0–1) | — | 3:17 | 25,491 | 59–39 | W4 |
| 99 | July 21 | 7:05 p.m. CDT | Rockies | L 0–5 | Brownson (1–0) | **Hampton** (8–5) | — | 2:10 | 28,718 | 59–40 | L1 |
| 100 | July 22 | 9:37 p.m. CDT | @ Dodgers | L 4–6 | Bohanon (3–6) | **Lima** (8–6) | Shaw (28) | 2:30 | 31,365 | 59–41 | L2 |
| 101 | July 23 | 9:07 p.m. CDT | @ Dodgers | **W** 8–6 (10) | **Henry** (7–2) | Hall (0–2) | **Powell** (4) | 3:38 | 40,205 | 60–41 | W1 |
| 102 | July 24 | | @ Padres | 2–1 | **Schourek** (6–6) | Hitchcock (4–4) | **Magnante** (2) | 2:34 | 31,047 | 61–41 | W2 |
| 103 | July 25 | | @ Padres | 5–6 | Langston (4–3) | **Reynolds** (12–6) | Hoffman (33) | 3:04 | 54,176 | 61–42 | L1 |
| 104 | July 26 | | @ Padres | 4–5 (10) | Wall (4–2) | **Magnante** (3–5) | — | 3:06 | 41,034 | 61–43 | L2 |
| 105 | July 27 | | Marlins | 9–1 | **Lima** (9–6) | Meadows (9–8) | — | 2:15 | 20,888 | 62–43 | W1 |
| 106 | July 28 | | Marlins | 7–3 | **Bergman** (10–5) | Ojala (1–1) | — | 2:47 | 26,220 | 63–43 | W2 |
| 107 | July 29 | | Marlins | 10–6 | **Schourek** (7–6) | Larkin (2–6) | **Elarton** (1) | 2:45 | 21,870 | 64–43 | W3 |
| 108 | July 30 | | Marlins | 3–4 | Hernandez (9–7) | **Reynolds** (12–7) | — | 2:35 | 33,303 | 64–44 | L1 |
| 109 | July 31 | | @ Pirates | 7–4 | **Hampton** (9–5) | Cordova (9–9) | **Henry** (2) | 3:00 | 32,476 | 65–44 | W1 |

August: 22–7 (Home: 14–3; Away: 8–4)

| # | Date | Time (CT) | Opponent | Score | Win | Loss | Save | Time of Game | Attendance | Record | Box/ Streak |
|---|---|---|---|---|---|---|---|---|---|---|---|
| 110 | August 1 | | @ Pirates | 2–1 | **Lima** (10–6) | Williams (2–1) | — | 2:49 | 19,783 | 66–44 | W2 |
| 111 | August 2 | | @ Pirates | 6–2 | **Johnson** (10–10) | Christiansen (1–2) | **Elarton** (2) | 2:35 | 21,201 | 67–44 | W3 |
| 112 | August 3 | | @ Marlins | 3–11 | Larkin (3–6) | **Bergman** (10–6) | Mantei (5) | 3:25 | 14,484 | 67–45 | L1 |
| 113 | August 4 | | @ Marlins | 9–5 | **Reynolds** (13–7) | Hernandez (9–8) | — | 3:19 | 14,586 | 68–45 | W1 |
| 114 | August 5 | | @ Marlins | 3–5 | Sanchez (5–6) | **Hampton** (9–6) | Mantei (6) | 2:46 | 19,038 | 68–46 | L1 |
| 115 | August 7 | | Phillies | 9–0 | **Johnson** (11–10) | Welch (0–2) | — | 2:21 | 52,071 | 69–46 | W1 |
| 116 | August 8 | | Phillies | 7–6 | **Henry** (8–2) | Leiter (6–3) | — | 2:52 | 42,523 | 70–46 | W2 |
| 117 | August 9 | | Phillies | 11–2 | **Reynolds** (14–7) | Beech (3–9) | — | 2:54 | 28,651 | 71–46 | W3 |
| 118 | August 10 | | Brewers | 5–2 | **Elarton** (1–0) | Fox (0–3) | **Wagner** (23) | 2:32 | 18,995 | 72–46 | W4 |
| 119 | August 11 | | Brewers | 6–5 (10) | **Magnante** (4–5) | Plunk (3–2) | — | 3:30 | 20,553 | 73–46 | W5 |
| 120 | August 12 | | Brewers | 3–0 | **Johnson** (12–10) | Woodall (5–7) | — | 2:39 | 40,217 | 74–46 | W6 |
| 121 | August 13 | | Brewers | 6–2 | **Lima** (11–6) | Woodard (9–7) | — | 2:20 | 21,218 | 75–46 | W7 |
| 122 | August 14 | | Cubs | 4–6 | Clark (7–11) | **Reynolds** (14–8) | Beck (35) | 2:53 | 45,040 | 75–47 | L1 |
| 123 | August 15 | | Cubs | 5–4 (11) | **Wagner** (3–3) | Mulholland (3–3) | — | 3:32 | 52,003 | 76–47 | W1 |
| 124 | August 16 | | Cubs | 1–2 (11) | Karchner (3–4) | **Powell** (4–5) | Beck (36) | 3:15 | 52,199 | 76–48 | L1 |
| 125 | August 17 | | @ Phillies | 0–4 | Byrd (1–0) | **Johnson** (12–11) | — | 2:27 | 18,975 | 76–49 | L2 |
| 126 | August 18 | | @ Phillies | 8–2 | **Lima** (12–6) | Grace (4–6) | — | 2:58 | 17,541 | 77–49 | W1 |
| 127 | August 19 | | @ Phillies | 4–3 | **Reynolds** (15–8) | Leiter (6–4) | **Wagner** (24) | 2:44 | 21,341 | 78–49 | W2 |
| 128 | August 20 | | @ Brewers | 5–6 (10) | Wickman (6–6) | **Magnante** (4–6) | — | 3:46 | 17,589 | 78–50 | L1 |
| 129 | August 21 | | @ Brewers | 5–2 | **Bergman** (11–6) | Pulsipher (1–1) | **Powell** (5) | 3:00 | 26,820 | 79–50 | W1 |
| 130 | August 22 | | @ Cubs | 8–3 | **Johnson** (13–11) | Wengert (1–3) | — | 3:00 | 39,886 | 80–50 | W2 |
| 131 | August 23 | | @ Cubs | 13–3 | **Lima** (13–6) | Trachsel (13–7) | — | 3:08 | 38,714 | 81–50 | W3 |
| 132 | August 24 | | @ Cubs | 12–3 | **Reynolds** (16–8) | Clark (7–12) | — | 2:58 | 34,711 | 82–50 | W4 |
| 133 | August 25 | | Braves | 3–2 | **Hampton** (10–6) | Millwood (14–8) | **Wagner** (25) | 2:24 | 32,157 | 83–50 | W5 |
| 134 | August 26 | | Braves | 2–6 | Smoltz (13–2) | **Bergman** (11–7) | — | 2:48 | 32,651 | 83–51 | L1 |
| 135 | August 28 | | Pirates | 2–0 | **Johnson** (14–11) | Cordova (12–11) | — | 2:23 | 40,709 | 84–51 | W1 |
| 136 | August 29 | | Pirates | 6–3 | **Lima** (14–6) | Schmidt (11–10) | **Powell** (6) | 2:39 | 41,762 | 85–51 | W2 |
| 137 | August 30 | | Pirates | 11–4 | **Reynolds** (17–8) | McCurry (1–3) | — | 3:12 | 25,342 | 86–51 | W3 |
| 138 | August 31 | | @ Braves | 4–3 | **Powell** (5–5) | Smoltz (13–3) | **Wagner** (26) | 2:43 | 33,883 | 87–51 | W4 |

September: 15–9 (Home: 9–5; Away: 6–4)

| # | Date | Time (CT) | Opponent | Score | Win | Loss | Save | Time of Game | Attendance | Record | Box/ Streak |
|---|---|---|---|---|---|---|---|---|---|---|---|
| 139 | September 1 | | @ Braves | 4–6 | Neagle (14–11) | **Elarton** (1–1) | Lightenberg (25) | 3:06 | 31,168 | 87–52 | L1 |
| 140 | September 2 | | @ Braves | 4–2 | **Johnson** (15–11) | Maddux (17–7) | **Wagner** (27) | 2:22 | 46,238 | 88–52 | W1 |
| 141 | September 4 | | @ Diamondbacks | 1–3 | Telemaco (6–8) | **Lima** (14–7) | Olson (26) | 2:27 | 41,396 | 88–53 | L1 |
| 142 | September 5 | | @ Diamondbacks | 6–5 (12) | **Wagner** (4–3) | Embree (4–1) | — | 4:05 | 43,638 | 89–53 | W1 |
| 143 | September 6 | | @ Diamondbacks | 10–1 | **Hampton** (11–6) | Daal (7–10) | — | 3:02 | 44,076 | 90–53 | W2 |
| 144 | September 7 | 4:06 p.m. CDT | Reds | **W** 1–0 | **Johnson** (16–11) | Parris (4–4) | — | 2:07 | 42,787 | 91–53 | W3 |
| 145 | September 8 | 7:06 p.m. CDT | Reds | **W** 13–7 | **Bergman** (12–7) | Bere (4–8) | — | 3:13 | 16,574 | 92–53 | W4 |
| 146 | September 9 | | Brewers | 6–2 | **Lima** (15–7) | Woodard (9–11) | **Wagner** (28) | 2:29 | 24,462 | 93–53 | W5 |
| 147 | September 10 | | Brewers | 7–1 | **Reynolds** (18–8) | Karl (9–9) | — | 2:54 | 20,813 | 94–53 | W6 |
| 148 | September 11 | | Cardinals | 8–2 | **Powell** (6–5) | Morris (5–5) | — | 2:34 | 52,186 | 95–53 | W7 |
| 149 | September 12 | | Cardinals | 3–2 | **Johnson** (17–11) | Oliver (9–10) | **Wagner** (29) | 2:36 | 52,493 | 96–53 | W8 |
| 150 | September 13 | | Cardinals | 2–3 | Mercker (11–11) | **Bergman** (12–8) | Acevedo (9) | 2:40 | 52,338 | 96–54 | L1 |
| 151 | September 14 | | Mets | 4–7 (13) | McMichael (4–4) | **Magnante** (4–7) | Franco (37) | 4:08 | 24,241 | 96–55 | L2 |
| 152 | September 15 (1) | | Mets | 6–5 (12) | **Powell** (7–5) | Tam (1–1) | — | 3:53 | — | 97–55 | W1 |
| 153 | September 15 (2) | | Mets | 4–8 | Leiter (16–5) | **Powell** (7–6) | Wendell (3) | 3:19 | 40,835 | 97–56 | L1 |
| 154 | September 16 | | Mets | 3–4 (11) | McMichael (5–4) | **Bergman** (12–9) | Wendell (4) | 4:05 | 24,269 | 97–57 | L2 |
| 155 | September 18 | | @ Pirates | 5–2 | **Johnson** (18–11) | Dessens (2–5) | **Powell** (7) | 2:47 | 16,937 | 98–57 | W1 |
| 156 | September 19 | | @ Pirates | 1–7 | Cordova (13–13) | **Lima** (15–8) | — | 2:21 | 20,670 | 98–58 | L1 |
| 157 | September 20 | | @ Pirates | 2–0 | **Reynolds** (19–8) | Schmidt (11–13) | **Wagner** (30) | 2:32 | 23,657 | 99–58 | W1 |
| 158 | September 22 | | @ Cardinals | 0–4 | Morris (7–5) | **Hampton** (11–7) | — | 2:15 | 40,739 | 99–59 | L1 |
| 159 | September 23 | | @ Cardinals | 7–1 | **Johnson** (19–11) | Oliver (10–11) | — | 3:05 | 38,997 | 100–59 | W1 |
| 160 | September 25 | | Cubs | 6–2 | **Lima** (16–8) | Tapani (19–9) | — | 2:38 | 51,831 | 101–59 | W2 |
| 161 | September 26 | | Cubs | 2–3 | Clark (9–14) | **Powell** (7–7) | Beck (50) | 2:50 | 51,950 | 101–60 | L1 |
| 162 | September 27 | | Cubs | 4–3 (11) | **Elarton** (2–1) | Beck (3–4) | — | 3:30 | 51,916 | 102–60 | W1 |

=== Detailed records ===
National League
| Opponent | W | L | WP | RS | RA |
NL East
Atlanta Braves
Florida Marlins
Montreal Expos
New York Mets
Philadelphia Phillies
Div Total
NL Central
Chicago Cubs
Cincinnati Reds
| **Houston Astros** | | | | | |
Milwaukee Brewers
Pittsburgh Pirates
St. Louis Cardinals
Div Total
NL West
Arizona Diamondbacks
Colorado Rockies
Los Angeles Dodgers
San Diego Padres
San Francisco Giants
Div Total
League Total
American League
Chicago White Sox
Cleveland Indians
Detroit Tigers
Kansas City Royals
Minnesota Twins
League Total
Season Total

| Month | Games | Won | Lost | Win % | RS | RA |
|---|---|---|---|---|---|---|
March
April
May
June
July
August
September
Total

| | Games | Won | Lost | Win % | RS | RA |
Home
Away
Total

=== Postseason game log ===
Legend
| | Astros win |
| | Astros loss |
| | Postponement |
| **Bold** | Astros team member |

1998 Postseason game log: 1–3 (Home: 1–1; Away: 0–2)
NL Division Series: vs. San Diego Padres 1–3 (Home: 1–1; Away: 0–2)

| # | Date | Time (CT) | Opponent | Score | Win | Loss | Save | Time of Game | Attendance | Series | Box/ Streak |
|---|---|---|---|---|---|---|---|---|---|---|---|
| 1 | September 29 | 3:07 p.m. CDT | Padres | L 1–2 | Brown (1–0) | **Johnson** (0–1) | Hoffman (1) | 2:38 | 50,080 | SD 1–0 | L1 |
| 2 | October 1 | 3:07 p.m. CDT | Padres | **W** 5–4 | **Wagner** (1–0) | Miceli (0–1) | – | 2:53 | 45,550 | Tied 1–1 | W1 |
| 3 | October 3 | 10:07 p.m. CDT | @ Padres | L 1–2 | Miceli (1–1) | **Elarton** (0–1) | Hoffman (2) | 2:32 | 65,235 | SD 2–1 | L1 |
| 4 | October 4 | 6:37 p.m. CDT | @ Padres | L 1–6 | Hitchcock (1–0) | **Johnson** (0–2) | – | 2:39 | 64,898 | SD 3–1 | L2 |

== Major League Baseball draft ==
Houston Astros 1998 MLB draft selections
| Rd. | Slot | Draftee | Position | School | Origin | Signed | Notes | Bio |
|---|---|---|---|---|---|---|---|---|
| 1 | 17 | Brad Lidge | Right-handed pitcher | Notre Dame | (California) | Y | (Note: Compensatory pick from the Colorado Rockies for signing Darryl Kile in free agency.) (Note: MLB debut on April 26, 2002, with Houston) | |
| 1 | 37 | Mike Nannini | Right-handed pitcher | Green Valley High | (Nevada) | Y | (Note: Supplemental pick for Colorado Rockies signing Darryl Kile.) | |
| 2 | None | | | | | | (Note: Pick assigned to San Francisco Giants as compensation for signing of free agent Doug Henry.) | |
| 3 | 92 | Brad Busbin | Right-handed pitcher | Dr. Phillips High | (Florida) | N | (Note: Signed with the Philadelphia Phillies from the 2002 draft.) | |
| 4 | 122 | Jason Van Meetren | Outfielder | Bishop Gorman High | (Nevada) | N | (Note: Signed with the Seattle Mariners from the 2001 draft.) | |
| 5 | 152 | Scott Barrett | Left-handed pitcher | San Jacinto | (Texas) | Y | | |
| 6 | 182 | Dave Matranga | Shortstop | Pepperdine | (California) | Y | (Note: MLB debut on June 27, 2003, with Houston) | |
| 7 | 212 | John Buck | Catcher | Taylorsville High (UT) | (Wyoming) | Y | (Note: MLB debut on June 25, 2004, with the Kansas City Royals) | |
| 8 | 242 | Jesse Joyce | Third baseman | Cal State Los Angeles | (California) | Y | | |
| 9 | 272 | Morgan Ensberg (Note: Ensberg and Ginter made their major league debuts during the same game.) | Third baseman | Southern California • 1998 | (California) | Y | (Note: MLB debut on September 20, 2000, with Houston) | |
| 10 | 302 | Keith Ginter | Second baseman | Texas Tech | (Texas) | Y | (Note: MLB debut on September 20, 2000, with Houston) | |
| 17 | 512 | Colin Porter | Outfielder | Arizona • 1998 | (Arizona) | Y | (Note: MLB debut on May 30, 2003, with Houston) | |

== Statistics ==
=== Batting ===
==== Starters by position ====
Note: Pos = Position; G = Games played; AB = At bats; H = Hits; Avg. = Batting average; HR = Home runs; RBI = Runs batted in

| Pos | Player | G | AB | H | Avg. | HR | RBI |
| C | Brad Ausmus | 128 | 412 | 111 | .269 | 6 | 45 |
| 1B | Jeff Bagwell | 147 | 540 | 164 | .304 | 34 | 111 |
| 2B | Craig Biggio | 160 | 646 | 210 | .325 | 20 | 88 |
| SS | Ricky Gutiérrez | 141 | 491 | 128 | .261 | 2 | 46 |
| 3B | Bill Spiers | 123 | 384 | 105 | .273 | 4 | 43 |
| LF | Moisés Alou | 159 | 584 | 182 | .312 | 38 | 124 |
| CF | Carl Everett | 133 | 467 | 138 | .296 | 15 | 76 |
| RF | Derek Bell | 156 | 630 | 198 | .314 | 22 | 108 |

==== Other batters ====
Note: G = Games played; AB = At bats; H = Hits; Avg. = Batting average; HR = Home runs; RBI = Runs batted in

| Player | G | AB | H | Avg. | HR | RBI |
| Sean Berry | 102 | 299 | 94 | .314 | 13 | 52 |
| Richard Hidalgo | 74 | 211 | 64 | .303 | 7 | 35 |
| Tony Eusebio | 66 | 182 | 46 | .253 | 1 | 36 |
| Tim Bogar | 79 | 156 | 24 | .154 | 1 | 8 |
| Dave Clark | 93 | 131 | 27 | .206 | 0 | 4 |
| J.R. Phillips | 36 | 58 | 11 | .190 | 2 | 9 |
| Jack Powell | 24 | 38 | 11 | .289 | 1 | 7 |
| Pete Incaviglia | 13 | 16 | 2 | .125 | 0 | 2 |
| Russ Johnson | 8 | 13 | 3 | .231 | 0 | 0 |
| Mitch Meluskey | 8 | 8 | 2 | .250 | 0 | 0 |
| Ray Montgomery | 6 | 5 | 2 | .400 | 0 | 0 |
| Daryle Ward | 4 | 3 | 1 | .333 | 0 | 0 |

=== Pitching ===
==== Starting pitchers ====
Note: G = Games pitched; IP = Innings pitched; W = Wins; L = Losses; ERA = Earned run average; SO = Strikeouts

| Player | G | IP | W | L | ERA | SO |
| Shane Reynolds | 35 | 233.1 | 19 | 8 | 3.51 | 209 |
| José Lima | 33 | 233.1 | 16 | 8 | 3.70 | 169 |
| Mike Hampton | 32 | 211.2 | 11 | 7 | 3.36 | 137 |
| Sean Bergman | 31 | 172.0 | 12 | 9 | 3.72 | 100 |
| Randy Johnson | 11 | 84.1 | 10 | 1 | 1.28 | 116 |
| Pete Schourek | 15 | 80.0 | 7 | 6 | 4.50 | 59 |
| John Halama | 6 | 32.1 | 1 | 1 | 5.85 | 21 |

==== Relief pitchers ====
Note: G = Games pitched; W = Wins; L = Losses; SV = Saves; ERA = Earned run average; SO = Strikeouts

| Player | G | W | L | SV | ERA | SO |
| Billy Wagner | 58 | 4 | 3 | 30 | 2.70 | 97 |
| Doug Henry | 59 | 8 | 2 | 2 | 3.04 | 59 |
| Mike Magnante | 48 | 4 | 7 | 2 | 4.88 | 39 |
| C.J. Nitkowski | 43 | 3 | 3 | 3 | 3.77 | 44 |
| Trever Miller | 37 | 2 | 0 | 1 | 3.04 | 30 |
| Jay Powell | 29 | 3 | 3 | 4 | 2.38 | 38 |
| Scott Elarton | 28 | 2 | 1 | 2 | 3.32 | 56 |
| Bob Scanlan | 27 | 0 | 1 | 0 | 3.08 | 9 |
| Reggie Harris | 6 | 0 | 0 | 0 | 6.00 | 2 |
| José Cabrera | 3 | 0 | 0 | 0 | 8.31 | 1 |
| Mike Grzanich | 1 | 0 | 0 | 0 | 18.00 | 1 |

== National League Divisional Playoffs ==
=== Houston Astros vs. San Diego Padres ===
The Astros season ended by defeat in four games to the San Diego Padres in the National League Division Series, including losing two starts against Kevin Brown – one of the league's highest-accomplished pitchers that year – both by a 2–1 score. As the Game 1 starter opposing Randy Johnson, Brown allowed no runs in eight innings and struck out 16 Astros, a career-high, and second to that point in MLB playoff history only to Bob Gibson's 17-strikeout performance in the 1968 World Series. Bagwell, Derek Bell, and Craig Biggio combined for six hits in 51 at bats in this series.

| Game | Home | Score | Visitor | Score | Date | Series |
|---|---|---|---|---|---|---|
| 1 | Houston | 1 | San Diego | 2 | September 29 | 1-0 (SD) |
| 2 | Houston | 5 | San Diego | 4 | October 1 | 1-1 |
| 3 | San Diego | 2 | Houston | 1 | October 3 | 2-1 (SD) |
| 4 | San Diego | 6 | Houston | 1 | October 4 | 3-1 (SD) |

== Awards and achievements ==
=== Grand slams ===
| No. | Date | Astros batter | Venue | Inning | Pitcher | Opposing team | Box |
|---|---|---|---|---|---|---|---|
| 1 | September 8 | Jeff Bagwell (Note: 1st MLB grand slam) | Astrodome | 3 | Rick Krivda | Cincinnati Reds | |

=== Career honors ===
Astros elected to Baseball Hall of Fame
| Individual | Position | Houston Astros career | | | | | Induction | |
| Individual | Position | Uni. | Seasons | Games | Start | Finish | Induction | |
|---|---|---|---|---|---|---|---|---|
| Don Sutton | Starting pitcher | 20 | 2 | 50 | 1981 | 1982 | Class | Plaque |
See also: Members of the Baseball Hall of Fame • Sources:

=== Annual awards ===
1998 Houston Astros award winners
| Name of award | | | Recipient | Ref. |
|---|---|---|---|---|
| Associated Press (AP) All-Star | | Second baseman | Craig Biggio | |
| Baseball America Manager of the Year | | | Larry Dierker | |
| Fred Hartman Award for Long and Meritorious Service to Baseball | | | Dennis Liborio | |
| Houston-Area Major League Player of the Year | | TOR | Roger Clemens | |
| Houston Astros | | Most Valuable Player (MVP) | Craig Biggio | |
| Houston Astros | | Pitcher of the Year | Shane Reynolds | |
| Houston Astros | | Rookie of the Year | Scott Elarton | |
| MLB All-Star Game | | Starting second baseman | Craig Biggio | |
| MLB All-Star Game | | Reserve outfielder | Moisés Alou | |
| MLB All-Star Game | | Home Run Derby contestant | Moisés Alou | |
| National League (NL) Manager of the Year | | | Larry Dierker | |
| National League (NL) Pitcher of the Month | | August | Randy Johnson | |
| National League (NL) Pitcher of the Month | | September | Randy Johnson | |
| National League (NL) Player of the Week | | May 31 | Moisés Alou | |
| National League (NL) Player of the Week | | August 2 | José Lima | |
| Silver Slugger Award | | Second baseman | Craig Biggio | |
| Silver Slugger Award | | Outfielder | Moisés Alou | |
| The Sporting News | Executive of the Year | | Gerry Hunsicker | |
| The Sporting News | NL All-Star | Second baseman | Craig Biggio | |
| The Sporting News | NL All-Star | Outfielder | Moisés Alou | |

Other awards results

| Name of award | Voting recipient(s) (Team) | Ref. |
|---|---|---|
| NL Cy Young | 1st—Glavine (ATL) • 7th—R. Johnson (HOU) | |
| NL Most Valuable Player | 1st—Sosa (CHC) • 3rd—Biggio (HOU) • 5th—Alou (HOU); Other Astros: 21st—R. Johnson | |

=== Offensive achievements ===
20 home runs—50 stolen bases club
| Player | AVG | Runs | HR | SB | PSN |
|---|---|---|---|---|---|
| Craig Biggio | .325 | 123 | 20 | 50 | 28.6 |

=== Pitching achievements ===
300 strikeout club
| Player | K | W–L | ERA | K/9 |
|---|---|---|---|---|
| Randy Johnson (Note: Includes full-season totals with both the Seattle Mariners and Houston Astros.) | 329 | 19–11 | 3.28 | 12.1 |

=== League leaders ===
NL batting leaders

- Doubles: Craig Biggio (51—led MLB)
- Plate appearances: Craig Biggio (738)
- Sacrifice flies: Derek Bell (10)

NL pitching leaders

- Games started: Shane Reynolds (35)
- Shutouts: Randy Johnson (6—led MLB) (Note: Did not accumulate enough to lead either the NL or the American League (AL) separately as result of mid-season trade.)
- Strikeout-to-walk ratio (K/BB): José Lima (5.28)
- Strikeouts: Randy Johnson (329—led MLB)

=== Milestones ===
==== Major League debuts ====
Player—Appeared at position

- Scott Elarton, starting pitcher
Date and opponent

- June 20 vs Cincinnati
Box

Also:

== Minor league system ==
| Level | Team | League | Manager |
|---|---|---|---|
| AAA | New Orleans Zephyrs | Pacific Coast League | John Tamargo |
| AA | Jackson Generals | Texas League | Jim Pankovits |
| A | Kissimmee Cobras | Florida State League | Manny Acta |
| A | Quad Cities River Bandits | Midwest League | Mike Rojas |
| A-Short Season | Auburn Doubledays | New York–Penn League | Lyle Yates |
| Rookie | GCL Astros | Gulf Coast League | Julio Linares |

Championships

- New York–Penn League champion: (Note: Co-champions with the Oneonta Yankees.) Auburn
- Pacific Coast League champion: New Orleans
- Triple-A World Series champions: New Orleans

Awards

- Baseball America First Team Minor League All-Star—Outfielder: Lance Berkman
- Houston Astros Minor League Player of the Year: Lance Berkman
- Texas League All-Star—Outfielder: Lance Berkman
- Triple-A World Series Most Valuable Player Award (MVP): Lance Berkman

== See also ==
- 20–50 club
- 300 strikeout club
- List of Major League Baseball 100 win seasons
- List of Major League Baseball annual doubles leaders
- List of Major League Baseball franchise postseason streaks
- List of Major League Baseball individual streaks
