= 1998 Major League Baseball postseason =

1998 Major League Baseball playoffs

Tournament details
- Dates: September 29 – October 21, 1998
- Teams: 8

Final positions
- Champions: New York Yankees (24th title)
- Runners-up: San Diego Padres

Tournament statistics
- Most HRs: Jim Thome (CLE) (6)
- Most SBs: Omar Vizquel (CLE) (4)
- Most Ks (as pitcher): Kevin Brown (SD) (46)

Awards
- MVP: Scott Brosius (NYY)

The 1998 Major League Baseball postseason was the playoff tournament of Major League Baseball for the 1998 season. The winners of the League Division Series would move on to the League Championship Series to determine the pennant winners that face each other in the World Series. This was the first postseason in which teams were seeded by their respective win–loss records within their respective leagues.

In the American League, the New York Yankees and Cleveland Indians returned to the postseason for the fourth year in a row, the Boston Red Sox returned to the postseason for the fifth time in thirteen years, and the Texas Rangers returned to the postseason for the second time in three years.

In the National League, the Atlanta Braves made their seventh straight postseason appearance, the Chicago Cubs returned to the postseason for the first time since 1989, the San Diego Padres were making their second appearance in the past three years, and the Houston Astros returned for the second year in a row, marking the first time that both Texas MLB teams made the postseason.

This was the first edition of the postseason since 1977 to feature three 100-win teams. This was also the first postseason to feature both the Cubs and Red Sox since the 1918 World Series.

The postseason began on September 29, 1998, and ended on October 21, 1998, with the 114-win New York Yankees sweeping the San Diego Padres in the 1998 World Series. It was the Yankees' 24th championship in franchise history, tying the NHL’s Montreal Canadiens for the most championship wins in North American sports.

== Teams ==
This was the first postseason in which teams were seeded by their respective win–loss record within their respective leagues.

- Division Champions were seeded 1–3.
- Wild Cards were automatically seeded 4 (regardless of having a better record than a Division Champion).
- The team with the better regular season record in the first two rounds had home-field advantage, with the wild card never having home-field until the World Series.
- The Division Series pitted the No. 1 seeded Division Champion against the No. 4 seeded Wild Card, while the No. 2 seeded faced the No. 3 seeded Division Champion.
  - If the No. 1 seeded Division Champion and the Wild Card were in the same division, the No. 1 seeded Division Champion would instead face the No. 3 seeded Division Champion while the No. 2 seeded Division Champion would face the No. 4 seeded Wild Card.
- Home-field advantage in the World Series was still based on yearly rotation at this time (until that changed in 2003, and again in 2017).
- This was also the first season in which the Division Series was conducted under a 2–2–1 format. The higher seed hosted Games 1–2, and 5 (if necessary). The lower seeded team hosted Games 3 and 4 (Game 4, if necessary). Previously, the team with home-field advantage in all best-of-5 postseason series (LCS from 1969–1984, LDS from 1981, 1995–1997) were conducted in a 2–3 format where the team with home-field advantage opened on the road for the first two games, while hosting the final three games (if Games 4 & 5 are necessary).
American League Teams National League Teams

The following teams qualified for the postseason:

=== American League ===
1. New York Yankees – 114–48, AL East champions
2. Cleveland Indians – 89–73, AL Central champions
3. Texas Rangers – 88–74, AL West champions
4. Boston Red Sox – 92–70

=== National League ===
1. Atlanta Braves – 106–56, NL East champions
2. Houston Astros – 102–60, NL Central champions
3. San Diego Padres – 98–64, NL West champions
4. Chicago Cubs – 90–73

== Playoff bracket ==
Division Series (ALDS, NLDS)
1	NY Yankees	3
3	Texas	0
American League
2	Cleveland	3
4	Boston	1
1	Atlanta	3
4	Chicago Cubs	0
National League
2	Houston	1
3	San Diego	3

League Championship Series (ALCS, NLCS)
1	NY Yankees	4
2	Cleveland	2
1	Atlanta	2
3	San Diego	4

World Series
AL1	NY Yankees	4
NL3	San Diego	0

== American League Division Series ==
=== (1) New York Yankees vs. (3) Texas Rangers ===
New York won the series, 3–0.

Game	Date	Score	Location	Time	Attendance
1	September 29	Texas Rangers – 0, New York Yankees – 2	Yankee Stadium (I)	3:02	57,362
2	September 30	Texas Rangers – 1, New York Yankees – 3	Yankee Stadium (I)	2:58	57,360
3	October 2	New York Yankees – 4, Texas Rangers – 0	The Ballpark in Arlington	2:58	49,450

This was the second postseason meeting between the Yankees and Rangers. They last met in the ALDS two years ago, which the Yankees won in four games. The Yankees swept the Rangers to return to the ALCS for the second time in three years.

This series was not close - the Yankees held the Rangers to only one run scored throughout the entire series. David Wells and Mariano Rivera silenced the Rangers’ offense in a Game 1 shutout. Andy Pettitte and Rivera would clamp down on the Rangers again as they won Game 2 by a 3–1 score, with the Rangers’ only run coming from Iván “Pudge” Rodríguez’s RBI single. David Cone and the Yankees’ bullpen silenced the Rangers’ offense in yet another shutout win in Arlington in Game 3.

The Yankees and Rangers would meet again the next year, which also ended in a Yankees sweep. It would be in 2010 that the Rangers would finally break through against the Yankees before falling in the World Series.

=== (2) Cleveland Indians vs. (4) Boston Red Sox ===
Cleveland won the series, 3–1.

Game	Date	Score	Location	Time	Attendance
1	September 29	Boston Red Sox – 11, Cleveland Indians – 3	Jacobs Field	3:16	45,185
2	September 30	Boston Red Sox – 5, Cleveland Indians – 9	Jacobs Field	3:25	45,229
3	October 2	Cleveland Indians – 4, Boston Red Sox – 3	Fenway Park	2:27	33,114
4	October 3	Cleveland Indians – 2, Boston Red Sox – 1	Fenway Park	3:00	33,537

This was the second postseason meeting between the Red Sox and Indians. They last met in the ALDS in 1995, which was won by the Indians before they fell in the World Series that year. The Indians once again defeated the Red Sox to return to the ALCS for the third time in four years.

The Red Sox blew out the Indians in Game 1 thanks to a pair of three-run home runs from Nomar Garciaparra and Mo Vaughn, which ended a 10-game playoff losing streak dating back to the 1986 World Series. Game 2 was an offensive showdown that was won by the Indians, capped off by a three-run home run from David Justice, which evened the series headed to Boston. In Game 3, Jim Thome, Kenny Lofton, and Manny Ramirez all homered for the Indians as they won by one run to take the series lead. In Game 4, the Red Sox took an early lead thanks to another home run from Garciaparra, but the Indians rallied to win in the eighth thanks to an RBI double from Justice.

Both teams would meet again in the ALDS the next year, the ALCS in 2007, and the ALDS again in 2016, with the Red Sox winning the former two, and the Indians winning the latter.

== National League Division Series ==
=== (1) Atlanta Braves vs. (4) Chicago Cubs ===
Atlanta won the series, 3–0.

Game	Date	Score	Location	Time	Attendance
1	September 30	Chicago Cubs – 1, Atlanta Braves – 7	Turner Field	2:34	45,598
2	October 1	Chicago Cubs – 1, Atlanta Braves – 2 (10)	Turner Field	2:47	51,713
3	October 3	Atlanta Braves – 6, Chicago Cubs – 2	Wrigley Field	2:57	39,597

This was the first postseason meeting between the Braves and Cubs. The Braves swept the Cubs to advance to the NLCS for a record seventh year in a row.

John Smoltz pitched seven shutout innings as the Braves blew out the Cubs in Game 1. In Game 2, the only extra inning contest of the series, the Braves prevailed off an RBI single from Chipper Jones in the bottom of the tenth to take a 2–0 series lead headed to Wrigley Field. In Game 3, the Braves took an early 1-0 lead, and then sealed their victory in the top of the eighth thanks to a grand slam by Eddie Pérez.

Both teams would meet again in the postseason in the NLDS in 2003, where the Cubs returned the favor to win their first postseason series since 1908.

=== (2) Houston Astros vs. (3) San Diego Padres ===
San Diego won the series, 3–1.

Game	Date	Score	Location	Time	Attendance
1	September 29	San Diego Padres – 2, Houston Astros – 1	Astrodome	2:38	50,080
2	October 1	San Diego Padres – 4, Houston Astros – 5	Astrodome	2:53	45,550
3	October 3	Houston Astros – 1, San Diego Padres – 2	Qualcomm Stadium	2:32	65,235
4	October 4	Houston Astros – 1, San Diego Padres – 6	Qualcomm Stadium	2:39	64,898

The Padres upset the team with the MLB's best offense in the Astros in four games to advance to the NLCS for the first time since 1984.

The Padres took Game 1 on the road as Kevin Brown out-dueled Astros' ace Randy Johnson on the mound, winning their first road playoff game in franchise history. Shane Reynolds pitched seven solid innings as the Astros evened the series in Game 2. When the series moved to San Diego for Game 3, the Padres' Jim Leyritz hit a solo home run in the bottom of the seventh to secure the win. In Game 4, the Padres closed out the series as Sterling Hitchcock out-dueled Johnson on the mound, handing him his second loss.

This was the last time the Padres won an NLDS series until 2022.

== American League Championship Series ==
=== (1) New York Yankees vs. (2) Cleveland Indians ===
New York won the series, 4–2.

Game	Date	Score	Location	Time	Attendance
1	October 6	Cleveland Indians – 2, New York Yankees – 7	Yankee Stadium (I)	3:31	57,138
2	October 7	Cleveland Indians – 4, New York Yankees – 1 (12)	Yankee Stadium (I)	4:28	57,128
3	October 9	New York Yankees – 1, Cleveland Indians – 6	Jacobs Field	2:53	44,904
4	October 10	New York Yankees – 4, Cleveland Indians – 0	Jacobs Field	3:31	44,981
5	October 11	New York Yankees – 5, Cleveland Indians – 3	Jacobs Field	3:33	44,966
6	October 13	Cleveland Indians – 5, New York Yankees – 9	Yankee Stadium (I)	3:31	57,142

This was the second postseason meeting between the Indians and Yankees. The Yankees defeated the defending American League champion Indians in six games to return to the World Series for the second time in three years.

David Wells pitched eight solid innings as the Yankees took Game 1. Game 2 was a long and grueling contest which was won by the Indians as Kenny Lofton had a two-run RBI single in the top of the twelfth which put them in the lead for good, evening the series headed to Cleveland. Bartolo Colón pitched a complete game as the Indians won Game 3 to take a surprising series lead over the 114-win Yankees. Orlando "El Duque" Hernández pitched seven innings of shutout ball in Game 4 as the Yankees shut out the Indians to even the series. Wells pitched seven innings in a 5–3 Yankees win in Game 5 to take a 3–2 series lead headed back to the Bronx. In Game 6, the Yankees jumped out to a big lead early and held it to clinch the pennant.

The Indians would return to the ALCS in 2007, but they fell to the eventual World Series champion Boston Red Sox in seven games after leading 3–1 in the series. They would eventually win the pennant again in 2016 over the Toronto Blue Jays in five games before coming up short in the World Series.

This was the first of four straight pennants won by the Yankees. They would win the pennant again the next year, defeating their archrival in the aforementioned Red Sox in five games. They would also win it again in 2000 and 2001 over the Seattle Mariners in six and five games respectively.

Both teams would meet again in the ALDS in 2007 and 2017, the Wild Card round in 2020, the ALDS again in 2022, and the ALCS again in 2024, with the Indians/Guardians winning the former and the Yankees winning the latter four.

== National League Championship Series ==
=== (1) Atlanta Braves vs. (3) San Diego Padres ===
San Diego won the series, 4–2.

Game	Date	Score	Location	Time	Attendance
1	October 7	San Diego Padres – 3, Atlanta Braves – 2 (10)	Turner Field	3:27	42,117
2	October 8	San Diego Padres – 3, Atlanta Braves – 0	Turner Field	2:54	43,083
3	October 10	Atlanta Braves – 1, San Diego Padres – 4	Qualcomm Stadium	3:00	62,799
4	October 11	Atlanta Braves – 8, San Diego Padres – 3	Qualcomm Stadium	2:58	65,042
5	October 12	Atlanta Braves – 7, San Diego Padres – 6	Qualcomm Stadium	3:17	58,988
6	October 14	San Diego Padres – 5, Atlanta Braves – 0	Turner Field	3:10	50,988

This was the first postseason meeting between the Padres and Braves. The Padres upset the NL-best Braves in six games to return to the World Series for the first time since 1984.

Game 1 was a long and grueling battle that was won by the Padres thanks to a go-ahead home run by Ken Caminiti in the top of the tenth. Kevin Brown pitched a three-hit complete game shutout in Game 2 as the Padres won 3-0 to take a 2-0 series lead headed home to San Diego. Sterling Hitchcock pitched five solid innings as the Padres took a commanding three games to none series lead, and were now one win away from the pennant. However, things didn’t go the Padres’ way just yet. Javy López and Andrés Galarraga helped bring the Braves’ offense back to as they blew out the Padres in Game 4 to get on the board in the series. Game 5 was an offensive shootout between both teams that was won by the Braves, as Greg Maddux earned a save, preventing the Padres from clinching the pennant in front of their home fans as the series went back to Atlanta. However, the Padres would close out the series in Game 6, as Hitchcock and the Padres’ bullpen silenced the Braves’ offense to clinch the pennant.

As of 2026, this is the last time that the Padres won the NL pennant. The Padres would eventually return to the NLCS in 2022, but were defeated by the Philadelphia Phillies in five games. Until 2020, this was the last playoff series win by the Padres.

The Braves would return to the NLCS again next year, and defeated the New York Mets in six games before they ultimately fell in the World Series.

Both teams would meet again in the Wild Card round in 2024, which was won by the Padres in a sweep.

== 1998 World Series ==
=== (AL1) New York Yankees vs. (NL3) San Diego Padres ===
New York won the series, 4–0.

Game	Date	Score	Location	Time	Attendance
1	October 17	San Diego Padres – 6, New York Yankees – 9	Yankee Stadium	3:29	56,712
2	October 18	San Diego Padres – 3, New York Yankees – 9	Yankee Stadium	3:31	56,692
3	October 20	New York Yankees – 5, San Diego Padres – 4	Qualcomm Stadium	3:14	64,667
4	October 21	New York Yankees – 3, San Diego Padres – 0	Qualcomm Stadium	2:58	65,427

This was the seventh New York–California matchup in the World Series (1962, 1963, 1973, 1977, 1978, 1981). The Yankees handily swept the Padres to win their second title in three years.

Game 1 was an offensive slugfest that was won by the Yankees. In Game 2, Orlando Hernández pitched seven solid innings as the Yankees blew out the Padres to take a 2-0 series lead headed to San Diego. In Game 3, the Padres lead after seven innings, but their lead was erased thanks to two homers from Scott Brosius as the Yankees came from behind to take a commanding three games to none series lead. Andy Pettitte and Mariano Rivera helped the Yankees shut out the Padres in Game 4 to complete the sweep and clinch the title. Game 4 was the last postseason game ever played at Qualcomm Stadium, and the most recent World Series game played in San Diego to date. Game 4 was also Tony Gwynn’s final postseason game.

With the win, the Yankees improved their World Series record against the California-based teams to 4-2, having previously won in 1962, 1977, and 1978. The Yankees tied the NHL’s Montreal Canadiens for the most championships in North American sports with their 24th championship, and would surpass the Canadiens the next year to become the team with the most championships, as they swept the Atlanta Braves to repeat as champions. The Yankees would then complete a three-peat in 2000 over their cross-town rivals in the New York Mets in five games.

As of 2026, this is the last championship series of the four major North American sports leagues to feature a team from San Diego.

== Broadcasting ==
This was the third season under a five-year U.S. rights agreement with ESPN, Fox, and NBC. Division Series games aired across the three networks. NBC then televised the American League Championship Series, while Fox aired both the National League Championship Series and the World Series.
