= Mike Grzanich =

American baseball player (born 1972)

- Pitcher
- Born: August 24, 1972 (age 53); Canton, Illinois, U.S.
- Batted: Right Threw: Right

MLB debut
- May 14, 1998, for the Houston Astros

Last MLB appearance
- May 14, 1998, for the Houston Astros

MLB statistics
- Games pitched: 1
- Earned run average: 18.00
- Strikeouts: 1
- Stats at Baseball Reference

Teams
- Houston Astros (1998)

Michael Edward Grzanich (born August 24, 1972) is an American former Major League Baseball (MLB) pitcher who played for the Houston Astros in 1998.

== Early life ==
Grzanich was born in Canton, Illinois, on August 24, 1972. He attended Lewistown High School and Parkland College.

== Professional career ==
Grzanich was a 19th-round draft pick of the Houston Astros during the 1992 MLB draft. He made his professional debut for the GCL Astros last that year, posting a 2–5 record and an earned run average of 4.54 in 17 appearances.

In 1993, Grzanich was promoted to the Single–A Auburn Astros of the New York–Penn League. He made 14 starts, with a 5–8 record and a 4.82 ERA. He also struck out 71 batters in 93.1 innings.

Grzanich spent 1994 with the Quad Cities River Bandits of the Single–A Midwest League. In 22 starts with Quad Cities, he went 11–7 with a 3.09 ERA and 101 strikeouts in 142.2 innings.

For the 1995 season, Grzanich was promoted to the Double–A Jackson Generals of the Texas League. He was converted from a starting pitcher to a relief pitcher and made 50 appearances from the bullpen. He had a 5–3 record, an ERA of 2.74, and 8 saves. In 65.2 innings, Grzanich struck out 44 but also surrendered 38 bases on balls.

Grzanish remained with Jackson in 1996. He made 57 relief appearances, posting a 5–4 record, 6 saves, and an ERA of 3.98. Over 72.1 innings, he struck out 80 batters and walked 43.

In 1997, Grzanich spent a third consecutive season with the Jackson Generals. He made 38 appearances (13 starts) and tallied a 7–6 record and 12 saves. His ERA was 4.96 over 101.2 innings, and he totaled 73 strikeouts and 46 walks.

Grzanich was promoted to the Triple–A New Orleans Zephyrs of the Pacific Coast League for the 1998 season. He made 34 appearances for New Orleans, recording a 1–1 record, a 2.27 ERA, and 5 saves. He also made his MLB debut on May 14 against the Pittsburgh Pirates and surrendered two earned runs in an inning of relief. On January 27, 1999, Grzanich was claimed off waivers by the Detroit Tigers.

1999 was Grzanich's final season in affiliated baseball. He struggled with the Triple–A Toledo Mud Hens, posting a 9.28 ERA in 14 appearances. He struck out 17 batters in 21.1 innings, but also recorded 25 walks.

After spending 2000 out of professional baseball, in 2001 Grzanich joined the Yuma Bullfrogs of the independent Western League for what would be his final season. He saw action in 7 games (4 starts), posting an ERA of 10.43.

== Personal life ==
Grzanich is married and has a daughter. After his playing career had ended, he paid $120 in an internet auction to buy the uniform he had worn during his lone MLB appearance.
