= 300 strikeout club =

Group of pitchers who have struck out 300 or more batters in a single season

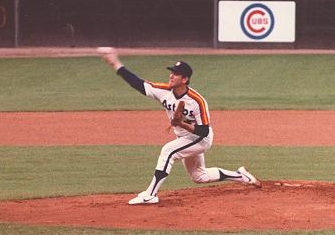
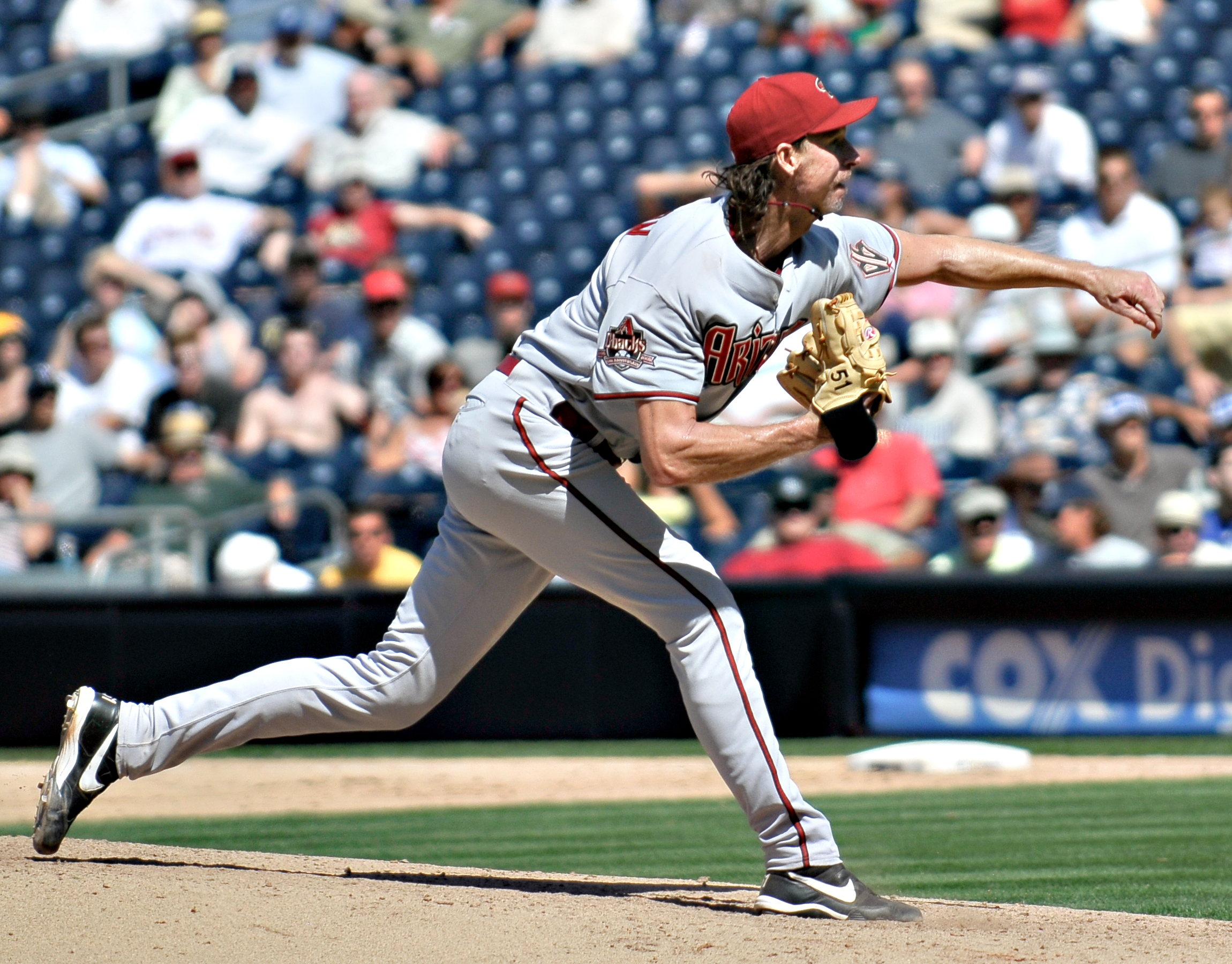
Nolan Ryan (left) and Randy Johnson (right) are the only pitchers to strike out 300 or more batters in a single season six times. Ryan also holds the modern MLB record of 383 strikeouts, achieved in 1973.

In Major League Baseball (MLB), the 300 strikeout club is a group of pitchers who have struck out 300 or more batters in a single season. In the modern era (post-1900), 19 different pitchers have reached the 300 strikeout mark 38 times as of the 2024 MLB season.

Since 1900, Nolan Ryan and Randy Johnson have recorded the most 300-strikeout seasons, with six each. The highest total in a 300-strikeout season is by Ryan with 383, followed by Sandy Koufax with 382. Rube Waddell was the first pitcher to record multiple 300-strikeout seasons, with two. Koufax and Curt Schilling each recorded three 300-strikeout seasons, followed by two each by Waddell, Sam McDowell, Walter Johnson, J. R. Richard, and Pedro Martínez.

In the pre-modern era, with a mound closer to home plate and constant rule changes, strikeouts were more common. Between 1880 and 1900, 23 different pitchers recorded 300 strikeouts or more 31 times. Six pitchers recording multiple 300-strikeout seasons; Tim Keefe and Amos Rusie each recorded three 300-strikeout seasons; Charles Radbourn, Ed Morris, John Clarkson, and Toad Ramsey each recorded two. Matt Kilroy holds the overall single-season strikeout record with 513, the only one to strike out 500 batters in a season; five other pitchers also recorded 400 or more strikeouts in a season, four of which occurred in the 1884 season.

== Members ==
Sandy Koufax was the first pitcher to record three 300-strikeout seasons, including the National League record (and then-MLB record) of 382 in 1965.

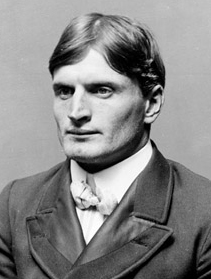
Rube Waddell's 349 strikeouts in 1904 were a modern MLB record for 62 years. He was also the first modern-era pitcher to record multiple 300-strikeout seasons, in 1903 and 1904.

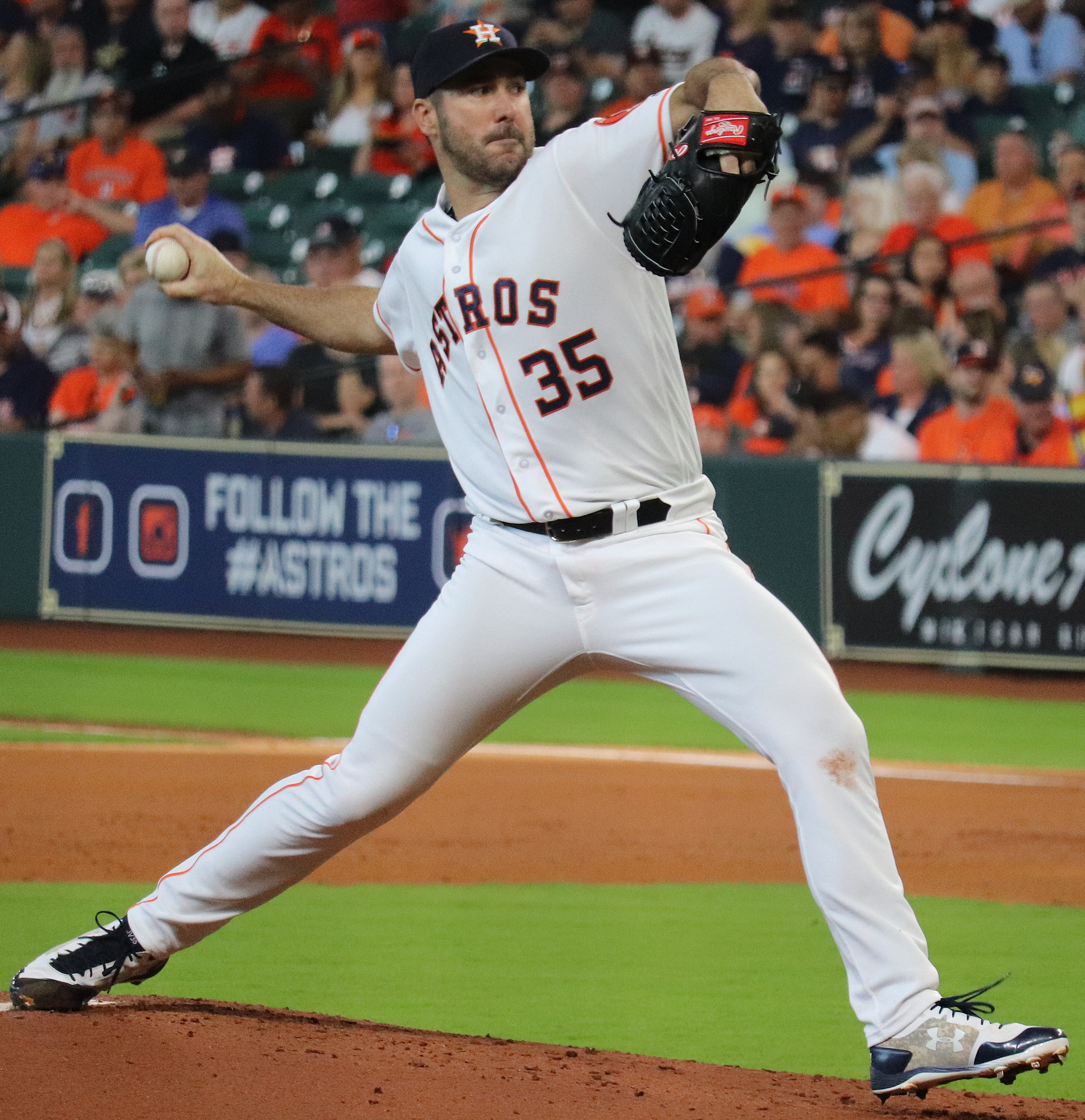
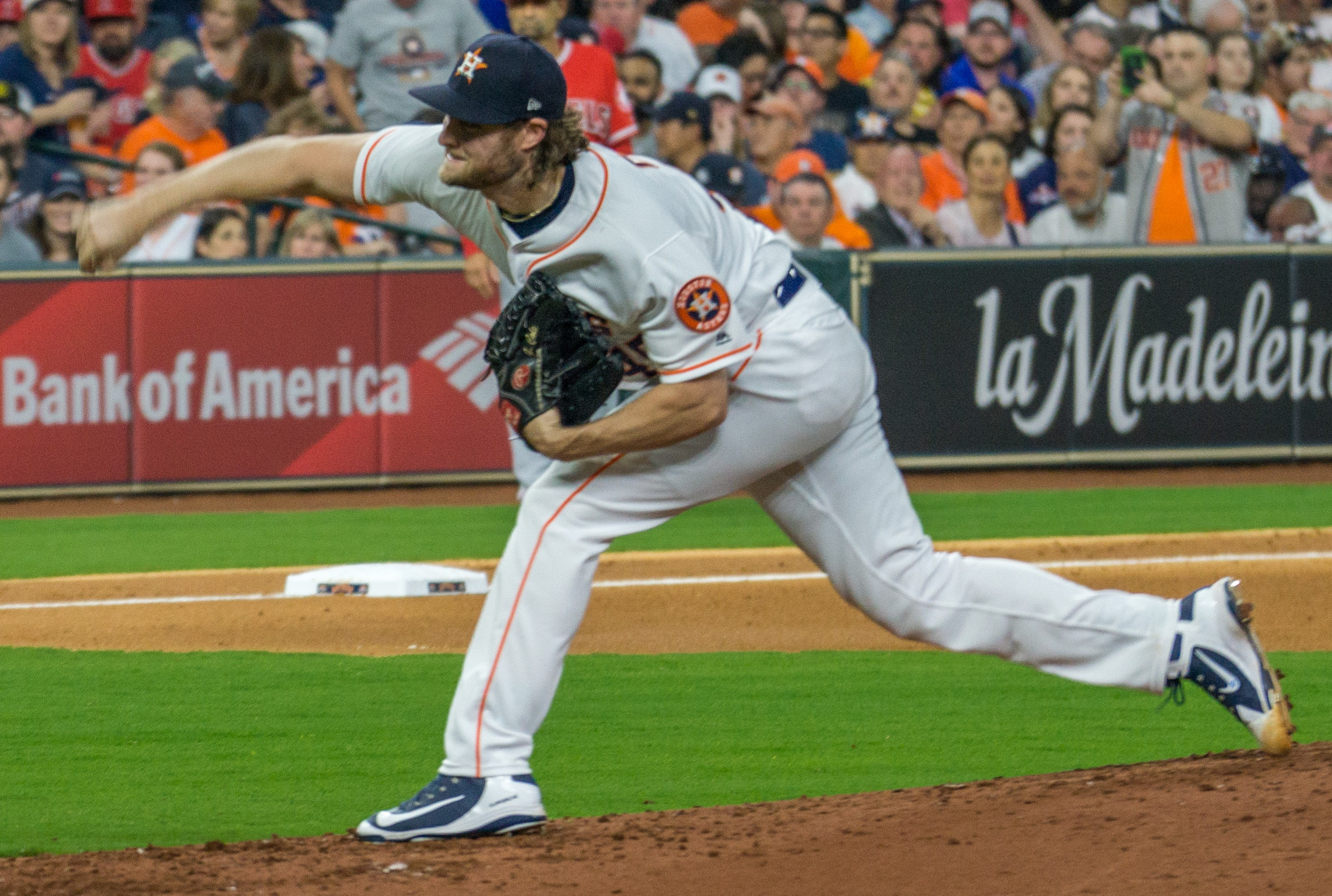
Justin Verlander (top) and Gerrit Cole (bottom) are the most recent pitchers to record 300 strikeouts in a season, both doing so in 2019.

Key
| Year | The year the player's 300 strikeout season occurred |
| Player | Name of the player and number of strikeout seasons they had accomplished at that point |
| Team | The player's team for his 300 strikeout season |
| Ks | Number of strikeouts in that season |
| ^ | Denotes single-season strikeout record progression |
| † | Elected to the Baseball Hall of Fame |
| ‡ | Player is active |

=== Modern era ===
| Year | Player | Team | Ks | Ref. |
|---|---|---|---|---|
| 1903 | Rube Waddell^{†} | Philadelphia Athletics | 302^{^} | |
| 1904 | Rube Waddell^{†} (2) | Philadelphia Athletics | 349^{^} | |
| 1910 | Walter Johnson^{†} | Washington Senators | 313 | |
| 1912 | Walter Johnson^{†} (2) | Washington Senators | 303 | |
| 1946 | Bob Feller^{†} | Cleveland Indians | 348 | |
| 1963 | Sandy Koufax^{†} | Los Angeles Dodgers | 306 | |
| 1965 | Sandy Koufax^{†} (2) | Los Angeles Dodgers | 382^{^} | |
| 1965 | Sam McDowell | Cleveland Indians | 325 | |
| 1966 | Sandy Koufax^{†} (3) | Los Angeles Dodgers | 317 | |
| 1970 | Sam McDowell (2) | Cleveland Indians | 304 | |
| 1971 | Vida Blue | Oakland Athletics | 301 | |
| 1971 | Mickey Lolich | Detroit Tigers | 308 | |
| 1972 | Steve Carlton^{†} | Philadelphia Phillies | 310 | |
| 1972 | Nolan Ryan^{†} | California Angels | 329 | |
| 1973 | Nolan Ryan^{†} (2) | California Angels | 383^{^} | |
| 1974 | Nolan Ryan^{†} (3) | California Angels | 367 | |
| 1976 | Nolan Ryan^{†} (4) | California Angels | 327 | |
| 1977 | Nolan Ryan^{†} (5) | California Angels | 341 | |
| 1978 | J. R. Richard | Houston Astros | 303 | |
| 1979 | J. R. Richard (2) | Houston Astros | 313 | |
| 1986 | Mike Scott | Houston Astros | 306 | |
| 1989 | Nolan Ryan^{†} (6) | Texas Rangers | 301 | |
| 1993 | Randy Johnson^{†} | Seattle Mariners | 308 | |
| 1997 | Pedro Martínez^{†} | Montreal Expos | 305 | |
| 1997 | Curt Schilling | Philadelphia Phillies | 319 | |
| 1998 | Randy Johnson^{†} (2) | Seattle Mariners; Houston Astros | 329 | |
| 1998 | Curt Schilling (2) | Philadelphia Phillies | 300 | |
| 1999 | Randy Johnson^{†} (3) | Arizona Diamondbacks | 364 | |
| 1999 | Pedro Martínez^{†} (2) | Boston Red Sox | 313 | |
| 2000 | Randy Johnson^{†} (4) | Arizona Diamondbacks | 347 | |
| 2001 | Randy Johnson^{†} (5) | Arizona Diamondbacks | 372 | |
| 2002 | Randy Johnson^{†} (6) | Arizona Diamondbacks | 334 | |
| 2002 | Curt Schilling (3) | Arizona Diamondbacks | 316 | |
| 2015 | Clayton Kershaw | Los Angeles Dodgers | 301 | |
| 2017 | Chris Sale^{‡} | Boston Red Sox | 308 | |
| 2018 | Max Scherzer^{‡} | Washington Nationals | 300 | |
| 2019 | Gerrit Cole^{‡} | Houston Astros | 326 | |
| 2019 | Justin Verlander^{‡} | Houston Astros | 300 | |

=== Pre-modern era ===
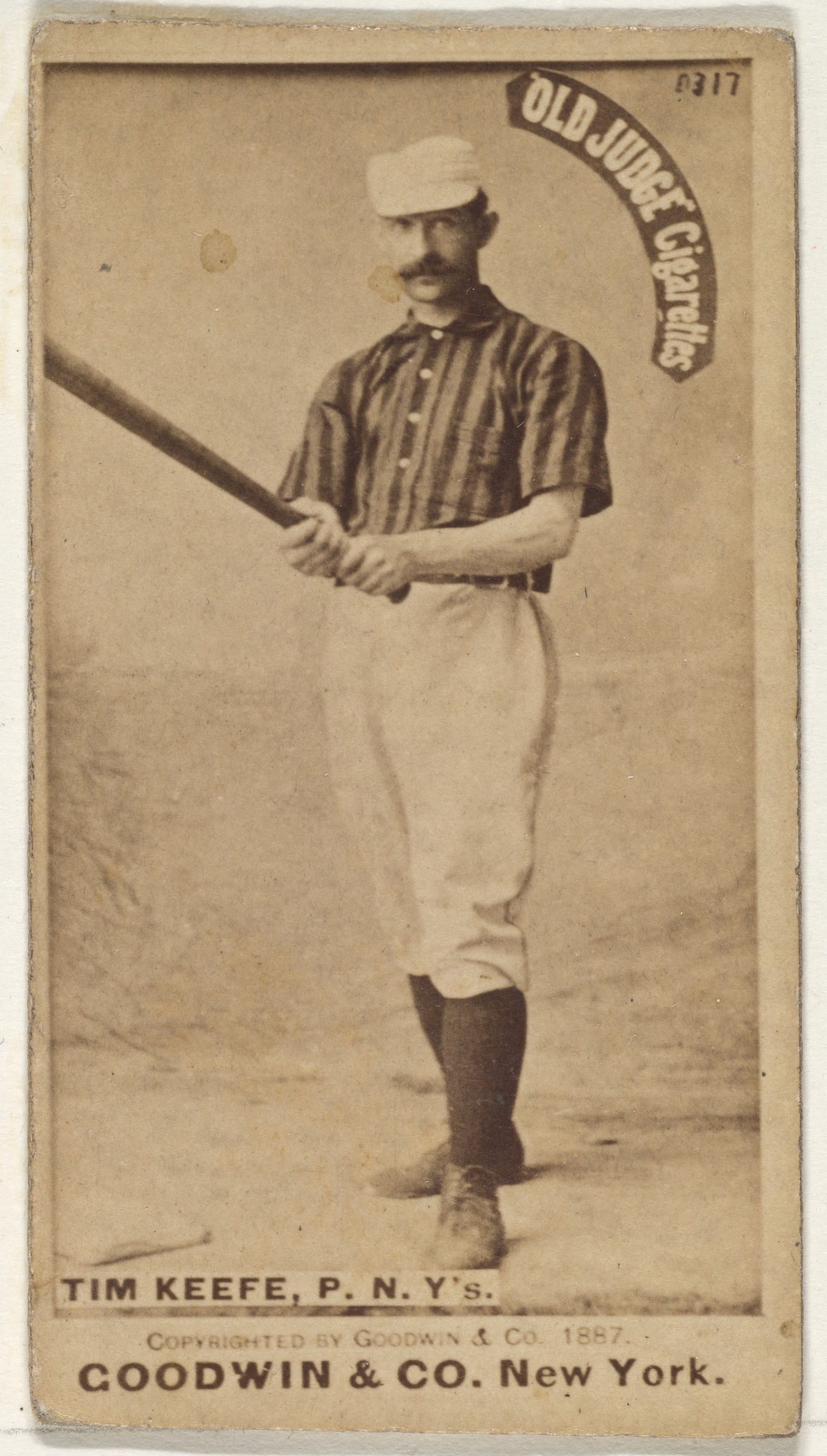
Hall of Famer Tim Keefe was the first MLB pitcher to record 300 strikeouts in a single season, with 359 in 1883.

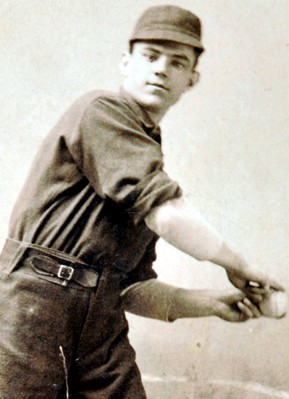
Matt Kilroy recorded 513 strikeouts in his rookie season in 1886, the all-time single season MLB record.

| Year | Player | Team | Ks | Ref. |
|---|---|---|---|---|
| 1883 | Tim Keefe^{†} | New York Metropolitans | 359^{^} | |
| 1883 | Jim Whitney | Boston Beaneaters | 345 | |
| 1883 | Charles Radbourne^{†} | Providence Grays | 315 | |
| 1884 | Hugh Daily | Chicago Browns; Washington Nationals | 483^{^} | |
| 1884 | Dupee Shaw | Boston Reds; Providence Grays | 451 | |
| 1884 | Charles Radbourne^{†} (2) | Providence Grays | 441 | |
| 1884 | Charlie Buffinton | Boston Beaneaters | 417 | |
| 1884 | Guy Hecker | Louisville Eclipse | 385 | |
| 1884 | Bill Sweeney | Baltimore Monumentals | 374 | |
| 1884 | Pud Galvin^{†} | Buffalo Bisons | 369 | |
| 1884 | Hardie Henderson | Baltimore Orioles | 346 | |
| 1884 | Mickey Welch^{†} | New York Gothams | 345 | |
| 1884 | Jim McCormick | Cleveland Blues; Cincinnati Outlaw Reds | 343 | |
| 1884 | Charlie Sweeney | Providence Grays; St. Louis Maroons | 337 | |
| 1884 | Tim Keefe^{†} (2) | New York Metropolitans | 334 | |
| 1884 | Tony Mullane | Toledo Blue Stockings | 325 | |
| 1884 | Larry McKeon | Indianapolis Hoosiers | 308 | |
| 1884 | Ed Morris | Columbus Buckeyes | 302 | |
| 1885 | John Clarkson^{†} | Chicago White Stockings | 308 | |
| 1886 | Matt Kilroy | Baltimore Orioles | 513^{^} | |
| 1886 | Toad Ramsey | Louisville Colonels | 499 | |
| 1886 | Ed Morris (2) | Pittsburgh Alleghenys | 326 | |
| 1886 | Lady Baldwin | Detroit Wolverines | 323 | |
| 1886 | John Clarkson^{†} (2) | Chicago White Stockings | 313 | |
| 1887 | Toad Ramsey (2) | Louisville Colonels | 355 | |
| 1888 | Tim Keefe^{†} (3) | New York Giants | 335 | |
| 1889 | Mark Baldwin | Columbus Solons | 368 | |
| 1890 | Amos Rusie^{†} | New York Giants | 341 | |
| 1891 | Amos Rusie^{†} (2) | New York Giants | 337 | |
| 1892 | Bill Hutchison | Chicago Colts | 368 | |
| 1892 | Amos Rusie^{†} (3) | New York Giants | 304 | |

== See also ==
- List of Major League Baseball annual strikeout leaders
