= Shane Reynolds =

American baseball player (born 1968)

- Pitcher
- Born: March 26, 1968 (age 58); Bastrop, Louisiana, U.S.
- Batted: Right Threw: Right

MLB debut
- July 20, 1992, for the Houston Astros

Last MLB appearance
- June 28, 2004, for the Arizona Diamondbacks

MLB statistics
- Win–loss record: 114–96
- Earned run average: 4.09
- Strikeouts: 1,403
- Stats at Baseball Reference

Teams
- Houston Astros (1992–2002); Atlanta Braves (2003); Arizona Diamondbacks (2004)

Career highlights and awards
- All-Star (2000); Houston Astros Hall of Fame

Richard Shane Reynolds (born March 26, 1968) is an American former starting pitcher in Major League Baseball who played from 1992 through 2004 for the Houston Astros, Atlanta Braves, and Arizona Diamondbacks. Listed at 6' 3", 210 lb., Reynolds batted and threw right-handed. He was born in Bastrop, Louisiana.

== College career ==
Reynolds attended Ouachita Christian High School in Monroe, Louisiana where he earned three All-State selections. He later attended the Faulkner University in Montgomery, Alabama and the University of Texas at Austin, where he was a two-time Southwest Conference first team selection, even though his high school coach often made the comment that Reynolds was a far better player at basketball than baseball.

== Major League career ==
The Astros selected Reynolds in the 3rd round of the 1989 MLB draft. Reynolds made his debut on July 20, 1992 as the starting pitcher against the Pittsburgh Pirates in Houston. He went 3 2/3 innings while allowing six runs on eight hits as the Astros lost 11–8. He appeared in seven further games in the next two months (starting four of them), going 1–3 in those games. It was his last game where he pitched his longest outing with five innings pitched, although he ended up with a 4–2 win. Overall, he struck out 10 batters while walking six on a 7.11 ERA. The following year, he would appear in just five total games, pitching twice in July and three times in the final eight games of the year (mostly as the middle reliever, although he did start Game 162). In total he pitched just eleven innings and struck out ten batters with six walks.

1994 was his first full year with the team. He went 8–5 with a 3.05 ERA while appearing in 33 games (14 starts). He pitched 124 innings while having 110 strikeouts and 21 walks. He received votes for Rookie of the Year, finishing 11th. The next year, he followed it up with more games as a starter, going 10–11 with a 3.47 ERA while pitching in 30 games for 189.1 innings. He struck out 175 batters while walking 37. Reynolds made his first start on Opening Day in 1996, doing so against the Los Angeles Dodgers at the Astrodome. He went five innings while allowing four runs on seven hits with five strikeouts and three walks in a 4-3 losing effort. That year, he went 16–10 with a 3.65 ERA in 35 games while pitching a career high 239 innings and striking out 204 and walking 44 while finishing 9th in Cy Young Award voting.

He started the 1997 season as the starter against the Atlanta Braves in the Astrodome. He went eight innings while allowing one run on seven hits in a 2–1 victory. He went 9–10 with a 4.23 ERA in 30 games while pitching 181 innings and having 152 strikeouts and 47 walks. With the Astros that year, they made the playoffs as the NL Central champions and faced off against the Atlanta Braves in the NLDS. Trying to avoid elimination, Reynolds pitched in Game 3 against John Smoltz in Houston. The Braves took the lead in the first inning on a two-out home run by Chipper Jones while a Jeff Blauser RBI single ultimately proved the winning run as Reynolds pitched six innings and allowed two runs on five hits as the Braves won 4–1.

His most productive season came in 1998, when he posted career numbers with a 19–8 record and a 3.51 earned run average in 233 1/3 innings of work. The Astros once again prevailed in the NL Central that year, and they faced off against the San Diego Padres in the NLDS. In Game 2, he went seven innings while allowing two runs on four hits although he would receive a no-decision in the 5-4 walk-off win (the only one in the series for the Astros). He followed with a 16–14 mark and a 3.85 ERA in 1999, while leading the league with 35 starts for the 2nd straight year. For the third straight year the Astros made it to the playoffs, and he would be the starting pitcher in Game 1. Facing the Braves and their ace Greg Maddux, Reynolds pitched six innings and allowed one run on seven hits as he prevailed over the Braves 6-1 for his only postseason win. In Game 4, he would last just five innings while allowing nine hits and four runs in 7–5 loss.

In addition, he collected 15 or more wins and logged 200 or more innings in 1996 and from 1998 to 1999. As a result, Reynolds reached his 100th win and hurled more than 200 innings quicker than did Nolan Ryan in an Astros uniform. He finished in the top six of strikeouts for a National League pitcher in 1995, 1996, 1998, and 1999 while leading in games started in 1998 and 1999 (35 each).

Reynolds made the Opening Day start in 2000, which made him the third Astro to have made five Opening Day starts (J.R. Richard and Mike Scott). Facing against Pittsburgh at the last Opening Day game held at Three Rivers Stadium, he went seven innings and allowed two runs on six hits while striking out four in a win as the Astros prevailed 5–2. He got onto a 5–0 start (with four no-decisions) before losing his first game on May 27. Leading into the MLB All-Star Game, he was on a downturn, as he was 6–5 in 18 games before his All-Star selection (his first and only in his career). He pitched just four games after that for the season.

In 2001, he bounced back in some ways, going 14–11 with a 4.34 ERA in 28 games while pitching 182.2 innings and striking out 102 and walking 36. In the 2001 NLDS that year, he faced the Braves once again. With the league-best Astros on the ropes in Game 3, he was tasked against John Burkett to have them live another day. However, he went just four innings while allowing four runs as the Braves swept the series with a 6–2 win. He regressed in his last year with the Astros for 2002, appearing in just 13 games while going 3–6 with a 4.86 ERA in 74 innings while striking out 47 and walking 26. He was granted free agency after the season but signed back with the team with the intent of playing the 2003 season. However, he was released on March 27; he was signed by the Braves on April 10. He went 11–9 with a 5.43 ERA in 30 games (29 starts) and 167.1 innings pitched. He had 94 strikeouts and 59 walks (a career high). On October 28, he was released by the Braves. On January 6, 2004, he was signed by the Arizona Diamondbacks. He pitched in just one game on June 28, going two innings and allowing six runs and hits in a loss to the San Diego Padres. On October 28, he was released.

== Coaching career ==
In 2013, Reynolds moved back to the Monroe/Bastrop area to become an assistant coach for his alma Mater, Ouachita Christian School.

== Honors ==
Following all his accomplishments in Major League Baseball, Reynolds entered the Louisiana Sports Hall of Fame as part of the Class of 2014 induction class. Previously, Houston inducted Reynolds into its Astros Walk of Fame in 2012.

== See also ==
- Houston Astros award winners and league leaders
- List of Major League Baseball pitchers who have thrown an immaculate inning
- Louisiana Sports Hall of Fame
