= List of Major League Baseball career putouts leaders =

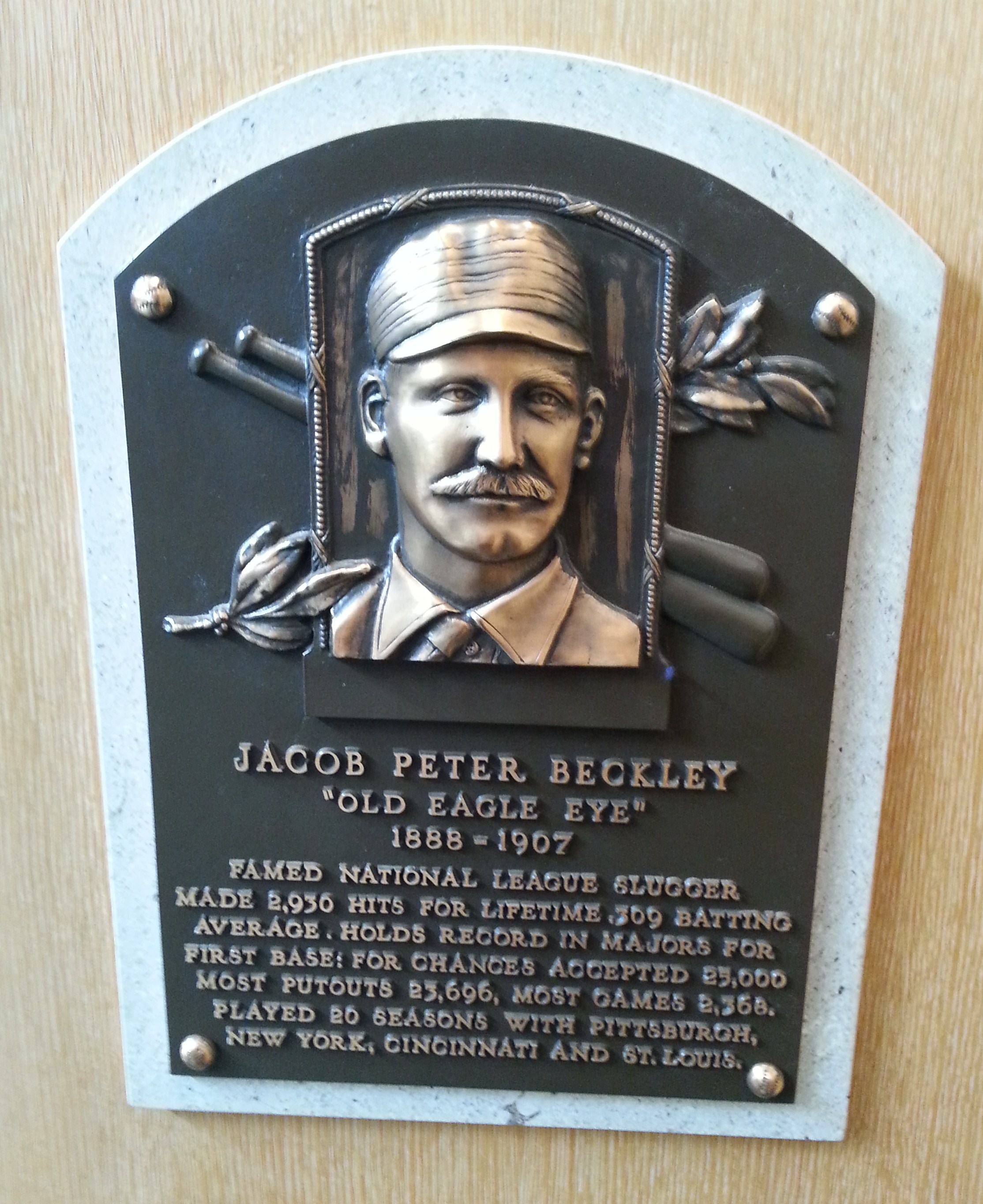
Jake Beckley, the all-time leader in career putouts.

In baseball statistics, a putout (denoted by PO or fly out when appropriate) is given to a defensive player who records an out by a tagging a runner with the ball when he is not touching a base (a tagout), catching a batted or thrown ball and tagging a base to put out a batter or runner (a Force out), catching a thrown ball and tagging a base to record an out on an appeal play, catching a third strike (a strikeout), catching a batted ball on the fly (a flyout), or being positioned closest to a runner called out for interference.

Jake Beckley is the all-time leader in career putouts with 23,743. Cap Anson (22,572), Ed Konetchy (21,378), Eddie Murray (21,265), Charlie Grimm (20,722), and Stuffy McInnis (20,120) are the only other players to record 20,000 career putouts.

== Key ==
**Rank**	Among leaders in career putouts. A blank field indicates a tie.
**Player (2026 POs)**	Recorded putouts in 2026.
**PO**	Career putouts.
*	Elected to National Baseball Hall of Fame.
**Bold**	Active player. (Note: A player is considered inactive if he has announced his retirement or has not played for a full season.)

== Overall ==
The top 100 in putouts in major league history.

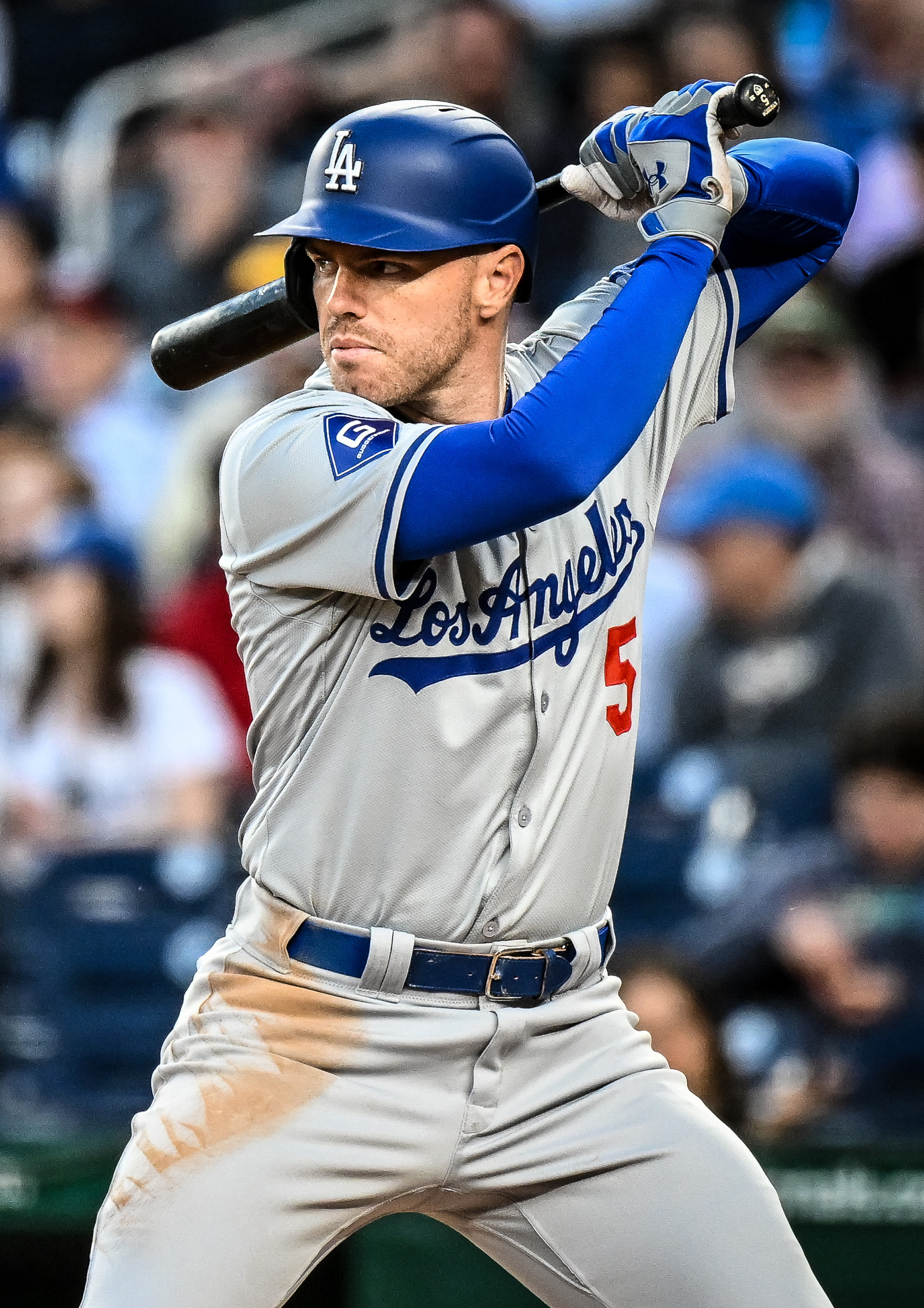
Freddie Freeman, the active leader in putouts and 27th all-time.

- Stats updated as of September 27, 2026.

Rank	Player (2026 POs)	PO
1	Jake Beckley*	23,743
2	Cap Anson*	22,572
3	Ed Konetchy	21,378
4	Eddie Murray*	21,265
5	Charlie Grimm	20,722
6	Stuffy McInnis	20,120
7	Mickey Vernon	19,819
8	Jake Daubert	19,634
9	Lou Gehrig*	19,525
10	Joe Kuhel	19,386
11	Joe Judge	19,265
12	Steve Garvey	19,004
13	Fred McGriff*	18,985
14	George Sisler*	18,914
15	Todd Helton*	18,905
16	Wally Pipp	18,779
17	Mark Grace	18,503
18	Hal Chase	18,346
19	Jim Bottomley*	18,337
20	Fred Tenney	18,278
21	Andrés Galarraga	18,224
22	Rafael Palmeiro	18,128
23	Roger Connor*	18,115
24	Keith Hernandez	17,916
25	Jimmie Foxx*	17,797
26	Chris Chambliss	17,771
27	**Freddie Freeman (1,015)**	17,761
28	Albert Pujols	17,620
29	Willie McCovey*	17,567
30	Jeff Bagwell*	17,546
31	George Burns	16,970
32	**Paul Goldschmidt (521)**	16,825
33	Will Clark	16,695
34	Dan Brouthers*	16,443
35	Tommy Tucker	16,433
36	John Olerud	16,165
37	Wally Joyner	16,081
38	Bill Terry*	15,999
39	Paul Konerko	15,965
40	Harry Davis	15,866
41	Gil Hodges*	15,722
42	Lu Blue	15,647
43	George Scott	15,601
44	Fred Merkle	15,513
45	Carlos Delgado	15,236
46	Yadier Molina	15,232
47	Norm Cash	15,173
48	Tony Pérez*	15,127
49	Bill Buckner	15,126
50	Tino Martinez	15,001

Rank	Player (2026 POs)	PO
51	Mark Teixeira	14,989
52	Adrián González	14,983
53	Iván Rodríguez*	14,922
54	Derrek Lee	14,910
55	Johnny Mize*	14,862
56	Orlando Cepeda*	14,829
57	Joey Votto	14,736
58	George Kelly*	14,690
59	Mark McGwire	14,464
60	Don Mattingly	14,270
61	Ernie Banks*	14,206
62	Eric Karros	14,056
63	Charles Comiskey*	13,900
64	Frank McCormick	13,803
	Dan McGann	13,803
66	Kent Hrbek	13,725
67	Dolph Camilli	13,724
68	Joe Adcock	13,678
69	**Carlos Santana (59)**	13,565
70	Rod Carew*	13,510
71	George McQuinn	13,414
72	Cecil Cooper	13,361
73	Elbie Fletcher	13,237
74	John Mayberry	13,169
75	Anthony Rizzo	13,128
76	Fred Luderus	13,126
77	Gus Suhr	13,104
78	Jason Kendall	13,067
79	Lee May	13,029
80	Bill White	13,015
81	George Stovall	12,899
82	Brad Ausmus	12,856
83	J.T. Snow	12,855
84	Kitty Bransfield	12,805
85	Boog Powell	12,796
86	Ted Kluszewski	12,652
87	A. J. Pierzynski	12,600
88	Dick Hoblitzell	12,591
89	Eric Hosmer	12,555
90	Jack Fournier	12,535
91	Candy LaChance	12,506
92	Gary Carter*	12,490
93	Stan Musial*	12,439
94	Phil Cavarretta	12,435
95	Pete Rose	12,394
96	Ryan Howard	12,351
97	Rudy York	12,308
98	Brian McCann	12,165
99	Walter Holke	12,158
100	Hal Trosky	12,125

== By position ==
=== Pitchers ===
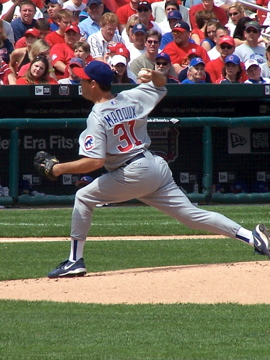
Greg Maddux, the all-time leader in putouts by a pitcher.

The pitcher is the player who pitches the baseball from the pitcher's mound toward the catcher to begin each play, with the goal of retiring a batter, who attempts to either make contact with the pitched ball or draw a walk. The pitcher is often considered the most important player on the defensive side of the game, playing the most difficult and specialized position, and as such is regarded as being at the right end of the defensive spectrum. Pitchers play far less than players at other positions, generally appearing in only two or three games per week; only one pitcher in major league history has appeared in 100 games in a single season. There are many different types of pitchers, generally divided between starting pitchers and relief pitchers, which include the middle reliever, lefty specialist, setup man, and closer. In the scoring system used to record defensive plays, the pitcher is assigned the number 1.

Pitchers typically record putouts by catching line drives or pop-ups, or by covering first base on ground balls to the first baseman. On pop-ups, however, pitchers will often instead act as a defensive supervisor, evaluating the ball's arc and selecting which infielder should make the catch. Pitchers can also record a putout while covering home plate by tagging a runner attempting to score a run if the catcher is retrieving a wild pitch, passed ball, or errant throw. Because of the relative rarity of such plays, as well as their reduced playing time, pitchers record far fewer putouts than players at any other position; players at every other position have recorded between five and forty-three times as many putouts as the top pitcher. Only four pitchers in history – none since 1886 – have recorded 50 putouts in a season, a total which a first baseman might reach in a week.

Career putout totals for pitchers have generally risen with the increase in long careers and the lengthening of the major league season in the early 1960s. The top 11 career leaders are all starting pitchers who have been active since 1962. Right-handed pitchers generally record more putouts due to their facing first base after the follow-through of their pitching motion; the top 24 leaders are all right-handed. Greg Maddux is the all-time leader in career putouts by a pitcher with 546; he is the only pitcher to record more than 400 career putouts.

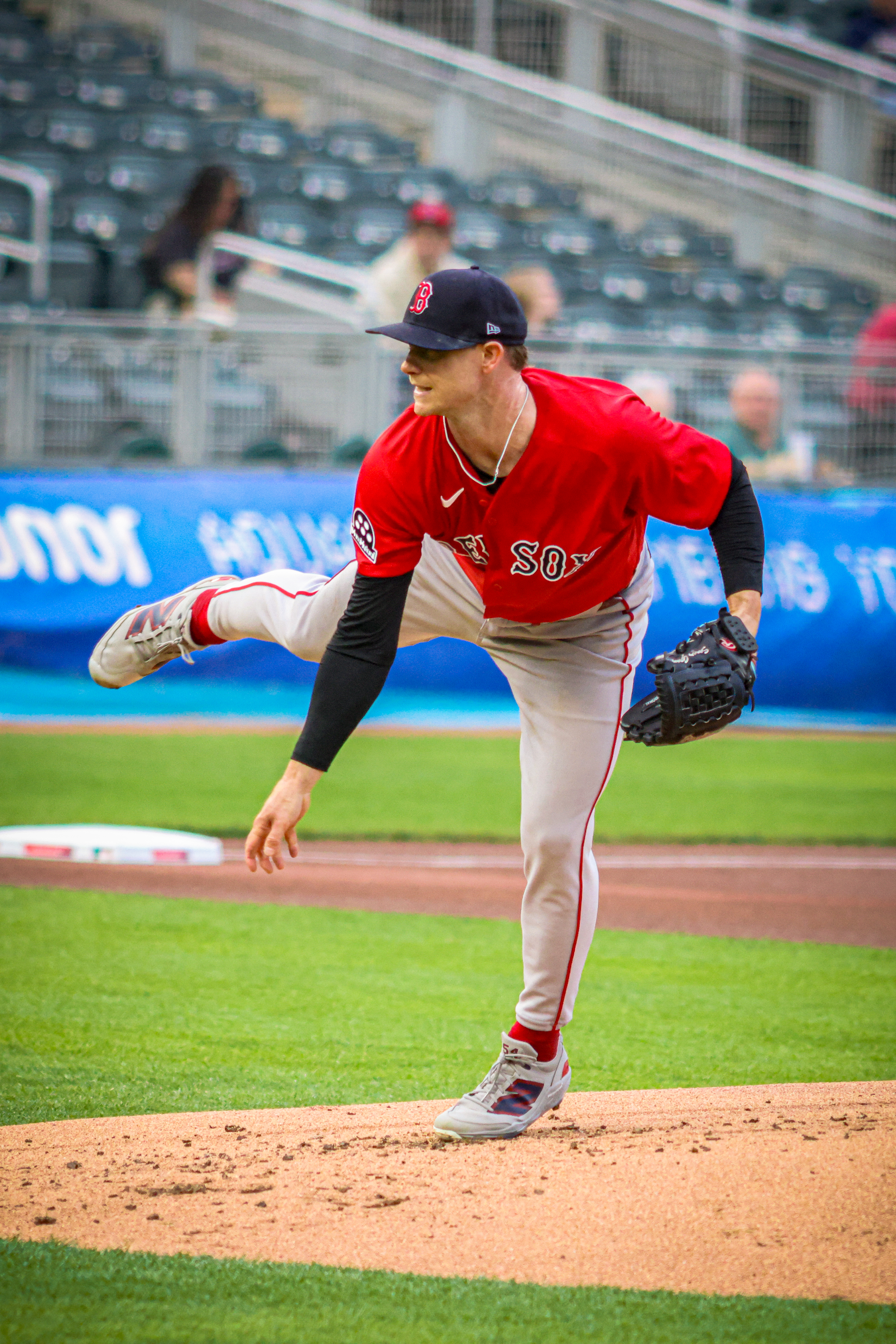
Sonny Gray, the active leader in putouts by a pitcher and 103rd all-time.

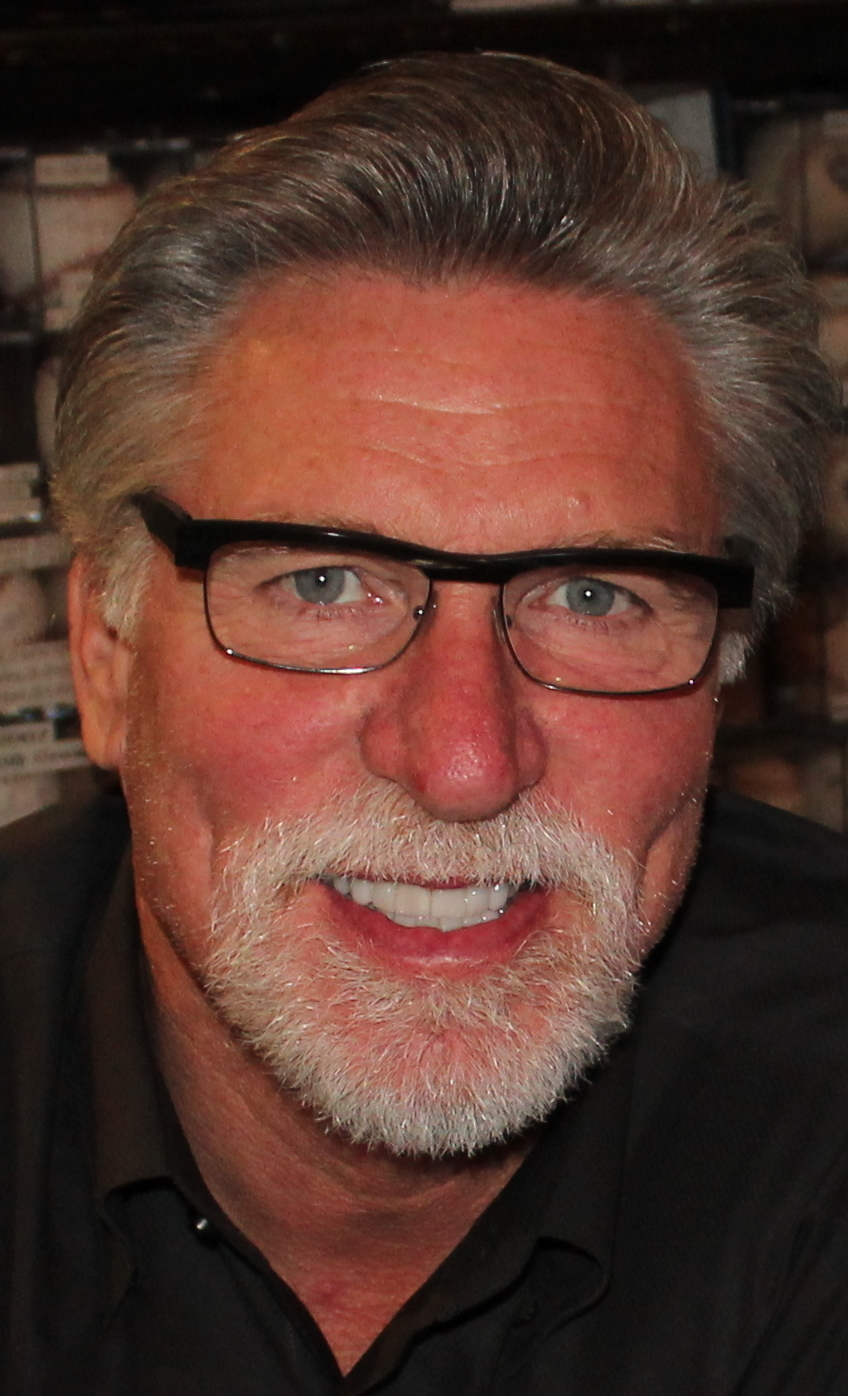
Jack Morris holds the American League record.

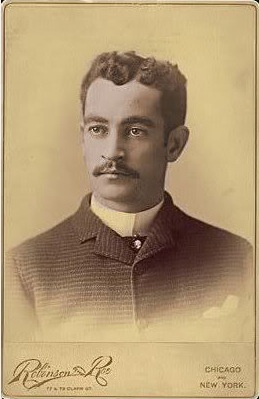
Tony Mullane held the major league record for 87 years.

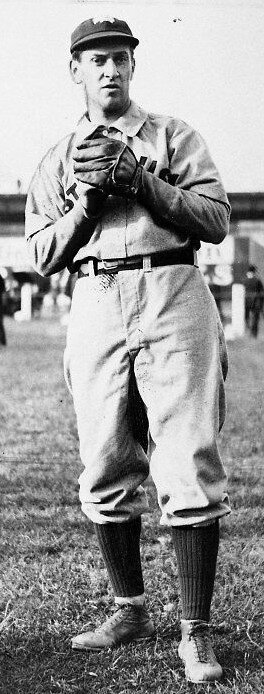
Kid Nichols held the National League record for 81 years.

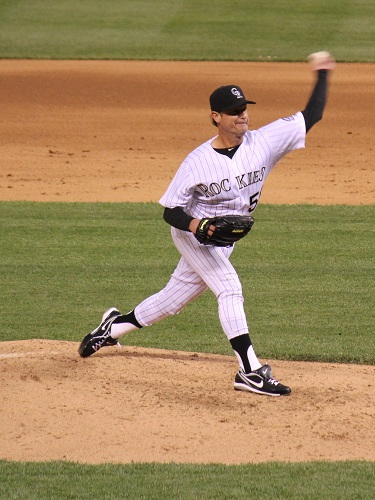
Jamie Moyer holds the record for left-handed pitchers.

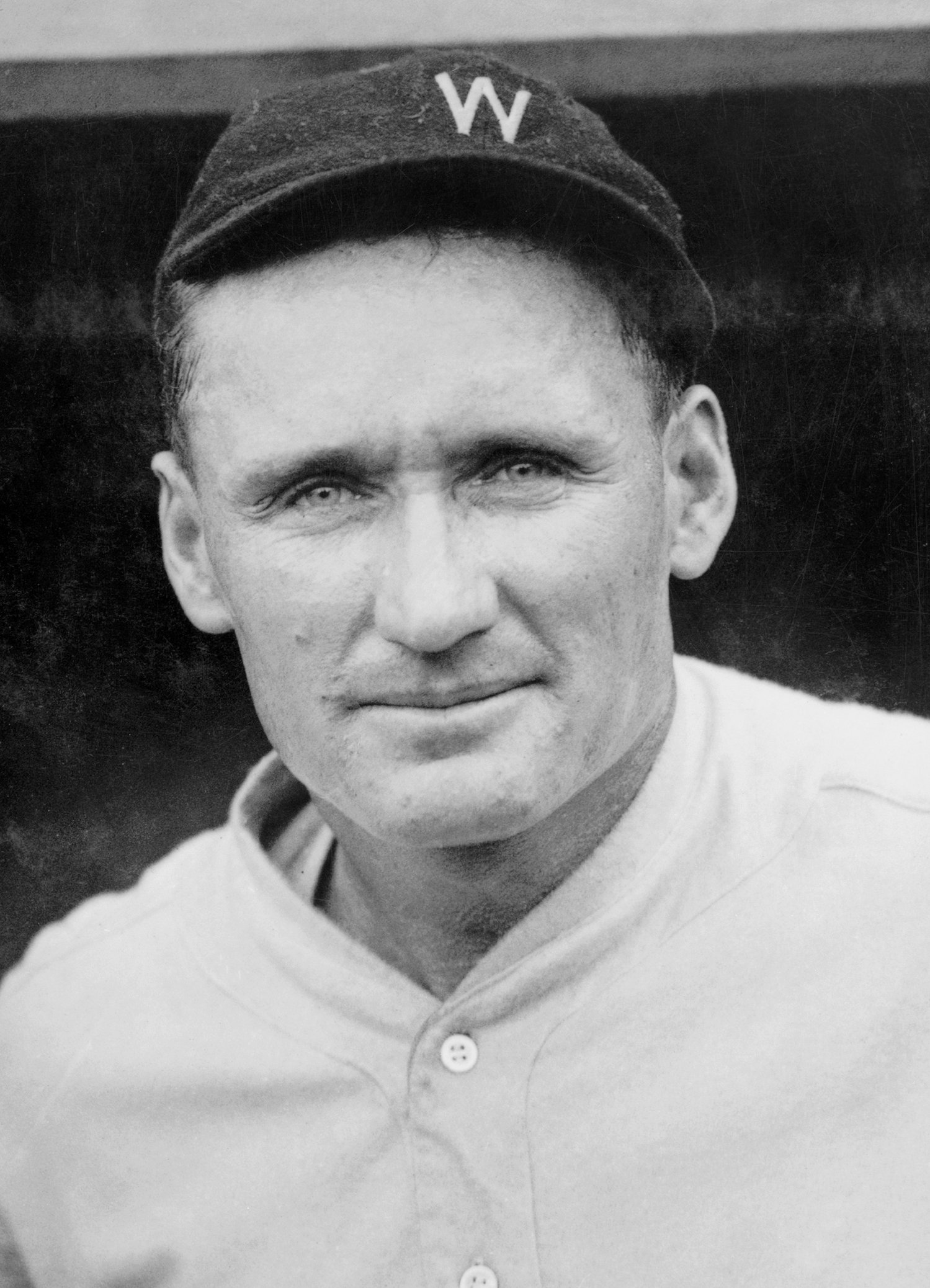
Walter Johnson held the American League record for 60 years.

- Stats updated through the 2026 season.

Rank	Player (2026 POs)	Throws	Putouts as a pitcher			Other leagues, notes
Rank	Player (2026 POs)	Throws	MLB	American League	National League	Other leagues, notes
1	Greg Maddux*	R	546	0	546	Held the modern National League single-season record, 1990-1999 (tie)
2	Kevin Brown	R	388	187	201	Holds the modern National League single-season record of 41 (set in 1999)
3	Jack Morris*	R	387	387	0	Held major league record, 1994-2000
4	Phil Niekro*	R	386	46	340	Held major league record, 1985-1994; held National League record, 1982-1998
5	Ferguson Jenkins*	R	363	176	187	Held major league record, 1981-1985
6	Gaylord Perry*	R	349	141	208	
7	Zack Greinke	R	340	151	189	
8	Don Sutton*	R	334	64	270	
9	Orel Hershiser	R	332	56	276	
10	Rick Reuschel	R	328	6	322	
	Tom Seaver*	R	328	48	280	
12	Tony Mullane	R	326	0	106	Includes 220 in American Association (league record); held major league record, 1894-1981; held the single-season record, 1882-1886
13	Pud Galvin*	R	325	0	276	Includes 26 in American Association, 22 in Players' League, 1 in National Association; held major league record, 1889-1894; held National League record, 1891-1901
14	Roger Clemens	R	320	296	24	
	John Smoltz*	R	320	4	316	
16	Dennis Martínez	R	319	196	123	
17	Chick Fraser	R	317	35	282	Held the modern single-season record, 1901-1902
18	Robin Roberts*	R	316	64	252	
19	Kid Nichols*	R	313	0	313	Held National League record, 1901-1982
20	Jim Palmer*	R	292	292	0	Held American League record, 1982-1990
21	Bob Gibson*	R	291	0	291	
	Juan Marichal*	R	291	4	287	
23	Bert Blyleven*	R	287	252	35	
24	Christy Mathewson*	R	281	0	281	
25	Jamie Moyer	L	279	203	76	
26	Mike Moore	R	278	278	0	
27	Walter Johnson*	R	276	276	0	Held American League record, 1922-1982
28	Dave Stieb	R	272	272	0	
29	Vic Willis*	R	271	0	271	Held the modern National League single-season record, 1902-1999
30	Doug Drabek	R	266	27	239	
31	Doyle Alexander	R	264	220	44	
32	Bob Lemon*	R	263	263	0	
	Jim McCormick	R	263	0	250	Includes 13 in Union Association; held major league record, 1885-1889
34	Tom Glavine *	L	262	0	262	
	Jim Kaat*	L	262	214	48	Held record for left-handed pitchers, 1980-2008
36	Tim Keefe*	R	260	0	196	Includes 49 in American Association, 15 in Players' League
37	Tim Hudson	R	258	114	144	
	Kenny Rogers	L	258	254	4	
39	Larry Jackson	R	257	0	257	
40	Dan Petry	R	255	251	4	
41	Joe Niekro	R	253	56	197	
42	Mike Boddicker	R	245	245	0	Holds the modern single-season record of 49 (set in 1984)
	Ted Breitenstein	L	245	0	244	Includes 1 in American Association; holds the single-season record for left-handed pitchers (46 in 1895)
	Lew Burdette	R	245	8	237	
	Milt Pappas	R	245	133	112	
46	Adonis Terry	R	244	0	106	Includes 138 in American Association
47	Bob Welch	R	243	102	141	
48	Mel Stottlemyre	R	242	242	0	
49	Freddie Fitzsimmons	R	237	0	237	
	Mark Gubicza	R	237	237	0	
	Tommy John	L	237	191	46	
	Steve Rogers	R	237	0	237	
53	Murry Dickson	R	236	10	226	
	Bobby Mathews	R	236	0	60	Includes 139 in National Association, 37 in American Association; held major league record, 1883-1886
	Adam Wainwright	R	236	0	236	
	Doc White	L	236	219	17	
57	Charlie Hough	R	235	193	42	
58	Bob Forsch	R	234	0	234	
59	Ed Walsh*	R	233	232	1	
60	Mike Mussina*	R	231	231	0	
61	Tom Candiotti	R	230	154	76	
	Charles Radbourn*	R	230	0	214	Includes 16 in Players' League
63	George Mullin	R	229	219	0	Includes 10 in Federal League; held the modern single-season record, 1903-1904 (tie)
	Eddie Plank*	L	229	216	0	Includes 13 in Federal League
	Cy Young*	R	229	72	157	
66	Bob Friend	R	228	3	225	
	Roy Halladay*	R	228	188	40	
68	Tim Wakefield	R	227	213	14	
69	Frank Tanana	L	226	215	11	
70	Burleigh Grimes*	R	225	1	224	
	Catfish Hunter*	R	225	225	0	
72	Dwight Gooden	R	224	33	191	
73	Scott Erickson	R	223	219	4	
	Mike Torrez	R	223	130	93	
75	John Lackey	R	222	156	66	
	Warren Spahn*	L	222	0	222	
77	Bronson Arroyo	R	221	47	174	
	John Clarkson*	R	221	0	221	
	Derek Lowe	R	221	108	113	
	Luis Tiant	R	221	218	3	
81	David Cone	R	220	119	101	
	Nolan Ryan*	R	220	125	95	
83	Ted Lyons*	R	219	219	0	
84	Tommy Bond	R	218	0	149	Includes 59 in National Association, 8 in Union Association, 2 in American Association
85	Mickey Welch*	R	217	0	217	
86	George Bradley	R	216	0	120	Includes 52 in National Association, 33 in Union Association, 11 in American Association; held the single-season record, 1876-1882
	Guy Hecker	R	216	0	8	Includes 208 in American Association
88	Mike Morgan	R	215	77	138	
89	Justin Verlander	R	214	192	22	
90	Mike Leake	R	213	35	178	
	Brad Radke	R	213	213	0	
92	Tim Belcher	R	212	118	94	
	Vern Law	R	212	0	212	
94	Bob Buhl	R	211	0	211	
	Liván Hernández	R	211	7	204	
	Albert Spalding*	R	211	0	47	Includes 164 in National Association; held major league record, 1874-1883
	Rick Sutcliffe	R	211	77	134	
98	Camilo Pascual	R	210	209	1	
99	Mel Harder	R	209	209	0	
	Harry Howell	R	209	192	17	

=== Catchers ===
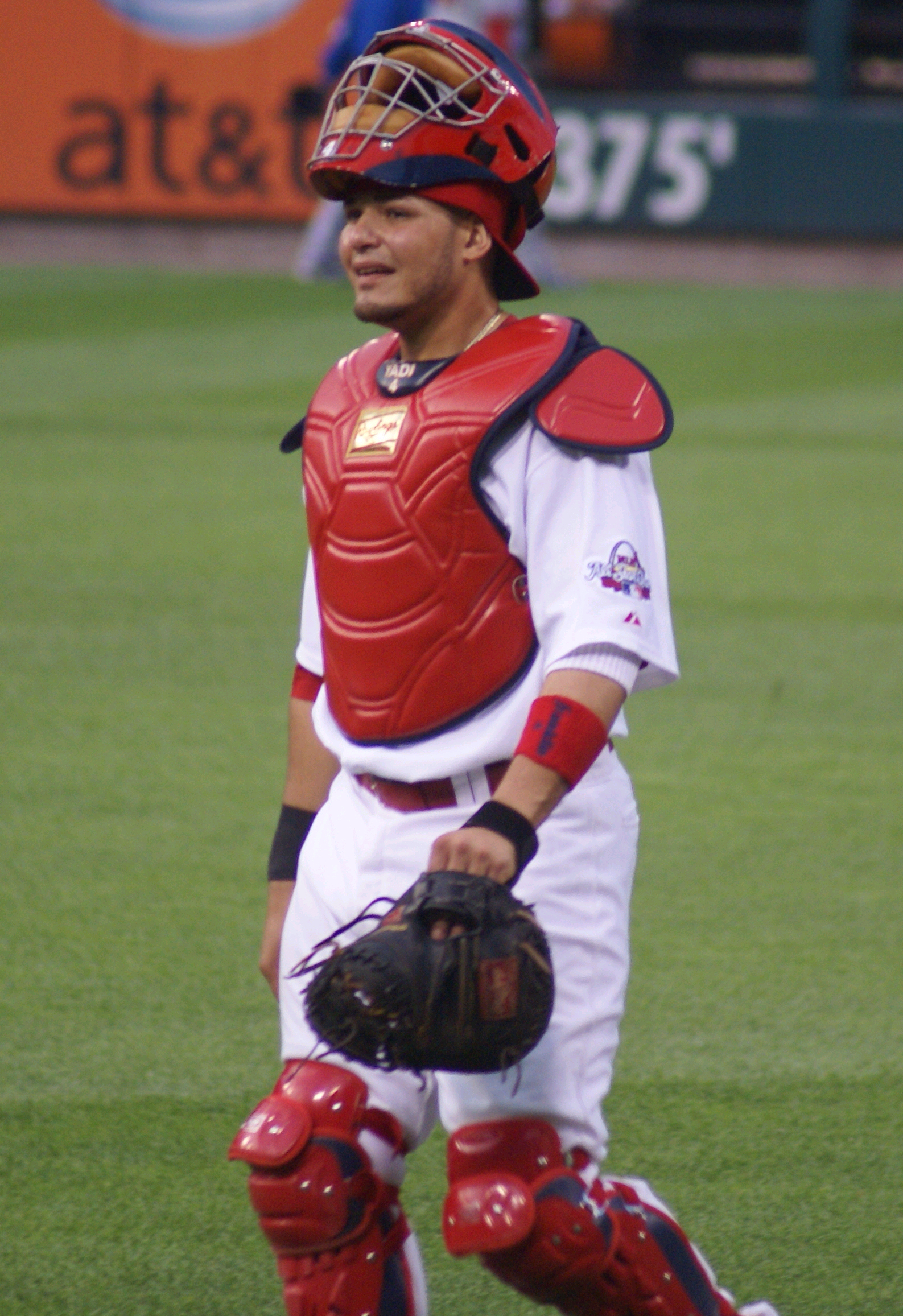
Yadier Molina, the leader in all-time putouts by a catcher.

The catcher is a defensive position for a baseball or softball player. When a batter takes his/her turn to hit, the catcher crouches behind home plate, in front of the (home) umpire, and receives the ball from the pitcher. In addition to these primary duties, the catcher is also called upon to master many other skills in order to field the position well. The role of the catcher is similar to that of the wicket-keeper in cricket. In the numbering system used to record defensive plays, the catcher is assigned the number 2.

The great majority of putouts recorded by catchers result from strikeouts, with almost all of the rest resulting from catching pop-ups and retiring runners tagged out or forced out at home plate, including attempts to steal home. On rare occasions, a catcher can record two putouts on a single play, usually by tagging out a runner trying to steal home immediately after the batter has struck out; on August 2, 1985, Carlton Fisk of the Chicago White Sox tagged out two New York Yankees moments apart at home plate when both tried to score on a double. The feat was duplicated by Paul Lo Duca of the New York Mets in Game 1 of the 2006 National League Division Series against the Los Angeles Dodgers. Putout totals are often not regarded as a strong indicator of a catcher's defensive skill because of the high number resulting from strikeouts. As trends in baseball have changed, with an increasing number of strikeouts per game, the proportion of catchers' putouts from strikeouts has risen steadily. In 1901, about 73% of catchers' putouts in the major leagues resulted from strikeouts (the figure is imprecise due to the occasional uncaught third strike either resulting in no putout or a putout being awarded to a different player); that figure rose to 78% in 1930, 84% in 1950 and 92% in 1980. In the 2021 season, 99% of catchers' putouts resulted from strikeouts; remarkably, the Atlanta Braves pitching staff recorded 1,417 strikeouts, but the team's catchers only recorded 1,394 putouts. Accordingly, putout totals for catchers have also risen steadily; through 2021, the top six major league catchers in career putouts, and 11 of the top 16, all made their major league debuts after 1990, with all 16 debuting in 1969 or later. Through 2021, 12 of the top 13 single-season totals were recorded in 2016 or later, and 90 of the top 100 were recorded since 1993.

Yadier Molina holds the record for the most putouts by a catcher with 15,122. Molina surpassed the previous holder, Hall of Famer Iván Rodríguez, on June 14, 2022, in the first game of a doubleheader against the Pittsburgh Pirates. Rodríguez (14,864) remains the only other catcher to record 14,000 career putouts.

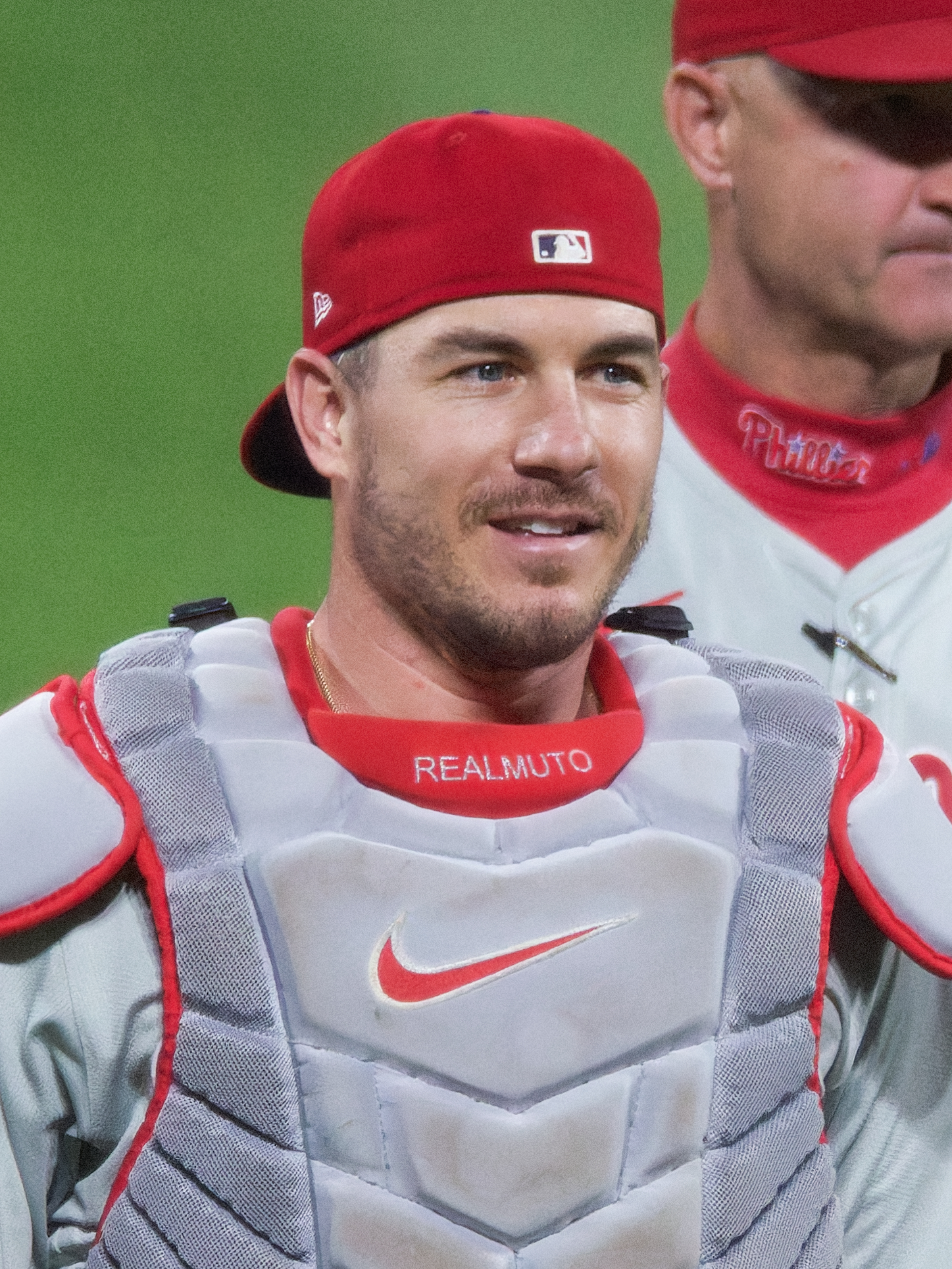
J.T. Realmuto, the active leader in career putouts as a catcher and 7th all-time.

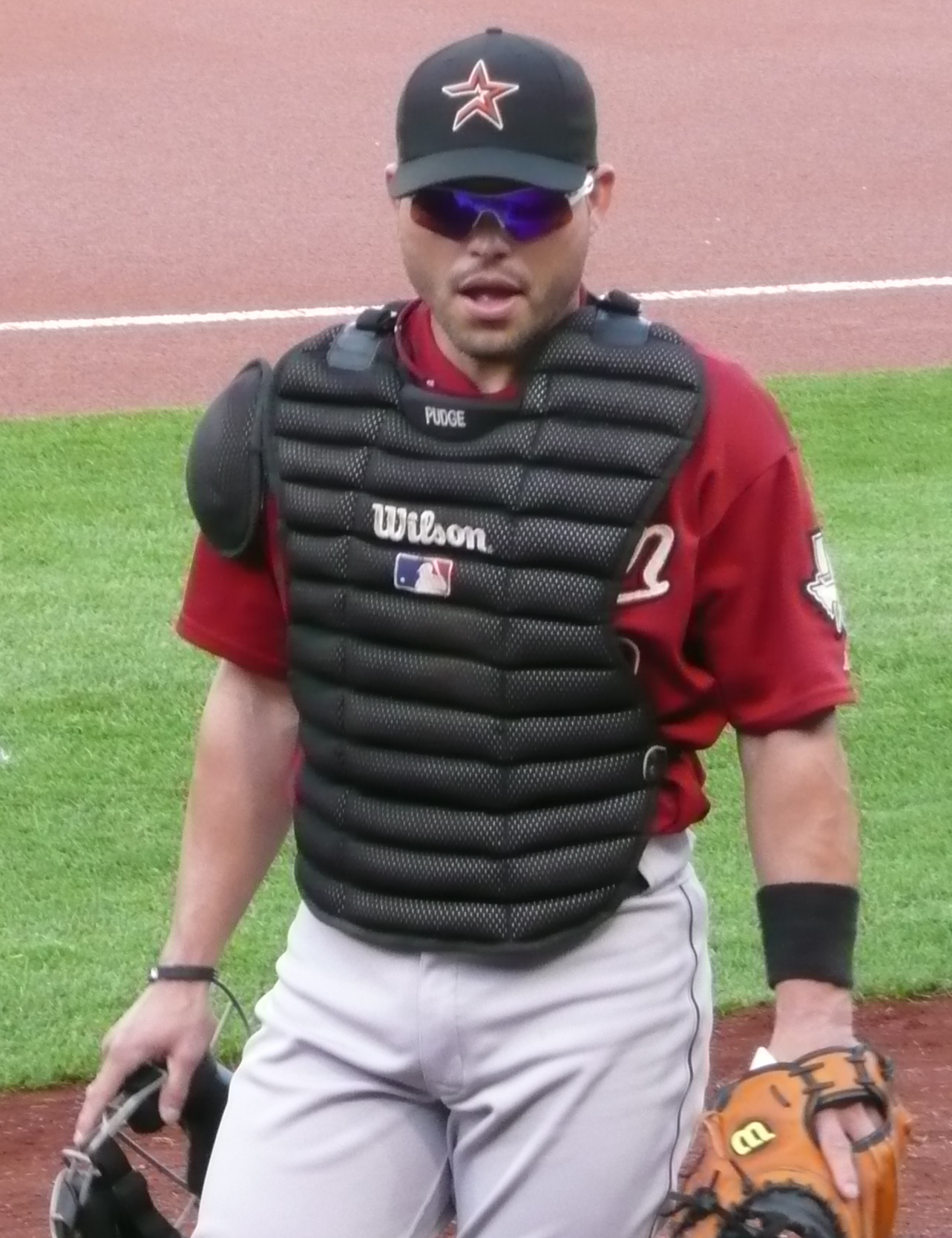
Ivan Rodríguez, holder of the American League career record.

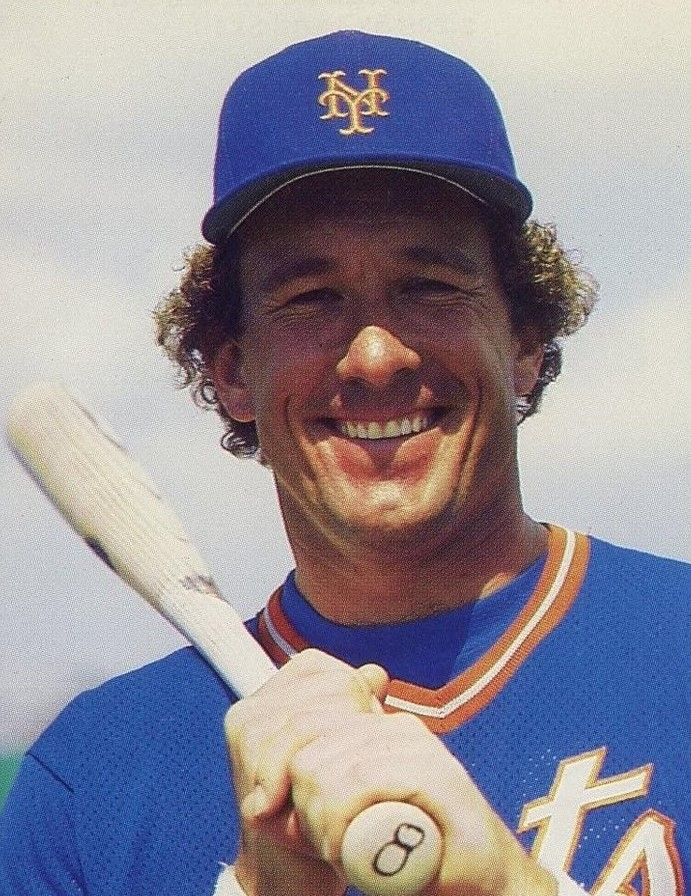
Gary Carter, the first catcher to record 10,000 putouts.

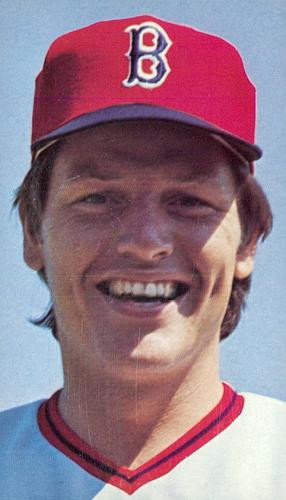
Carlton Fisk held the American League record for 17 years.

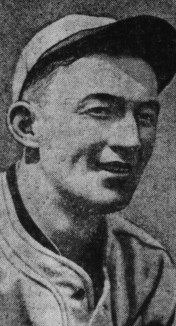
Gabby Hartnett held the National League record for 30 years.

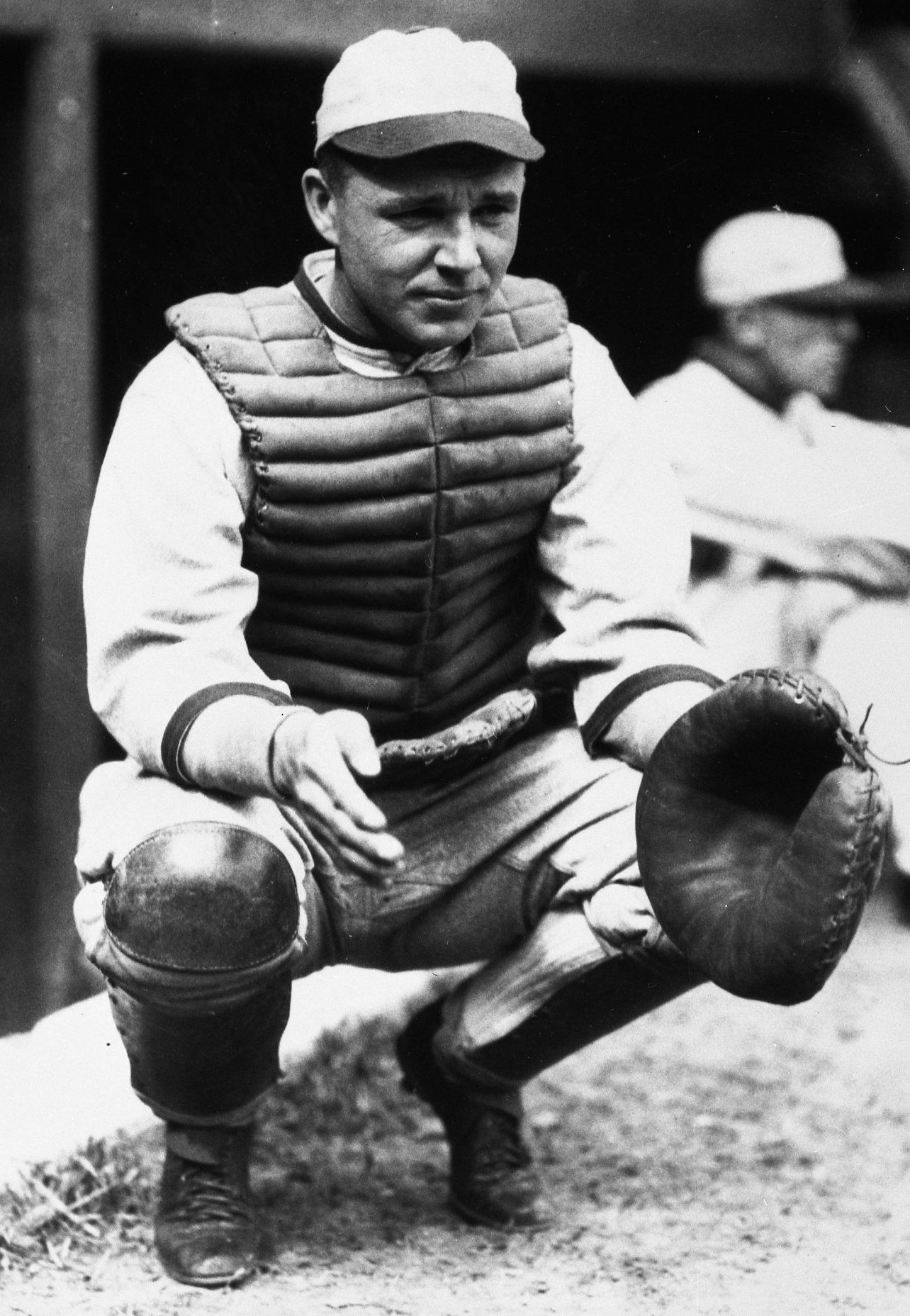
Ray Schalk led the American League in putouts for a record nine times.

- Stats updated as of September 27, 2026.

Rank	Player (2026 POs)	Putouts as a catcher			Other leagues, notes
Rank	Player (2026 POs)	MLB	American League	National League	Other leagues, notes
1	Yadier Molina	15,122	0	15,122	
2	Iván Rodríguez*	14,864	12,377	2,487	Held major league record, 2007-2022
3	Jason Kendall	13,019	3,116	9,903	
4	Brad Ausmus	12,839	2,104	10,735	
5	A. J. Pierzynski	12,600	10,562	2,038	
6	Brian McCann	12,048	4,086	7,962	
7	**J. T. Realmuto (1,216)**	11,834	0	11,834	
8	Gary Carter*	11,785	0	11,785	Held major league record, 1988-1989, 1991-2007; held NL record, 1987-2018
9	Russell Martin	11,612	4,815	6,797	
10	Carlton Fisk*	11,369	11,369	0	Held American League record, 1990-2007
11	Bob Boone	11,260	5,583	5,677	Held major league record, 1989-1991
12	Tony Peña	11,212	4,408	6,804	
13	Kurt Suzuki	10,869	7,755	3,114	
14	Mike Piazza*	10,844	0	10,844	
15	Benito Santiago	10,816	894	9,922	
16	**Salvador Perez (344)**	10,426	10,426	0	
17	Jason Varitek	10,166	10,166	0	
18	Jorge Posada	10,016	10,016	0	
19	Bill Freehan	9,941	9,941	0	Held major league record, 1975-1988; held AL record, 1973-1990; held AL single-season record, 1967-1997
20	Jim Sundberg	9,767	9,406	361	
21	Lance Parrish	9,647	8,059	1,588	
22	Martín Maldonado	9,292	6,770	2,522	
23	John Roseboro	9,291	1,396	7,895	Held major league record, 1969-1975; held NL record, 1966-1972; held single-season record, 1959-1963
24	Johnny Bench*	9,249	0	9,249	Held National League record, 1980-1987
25	**Yasmani Grandal (0)**	9,115	2,235	6,880	Holds the single-season record of 1,169 (set in 2019)
26	Ramón Hernández	9,012	5,740	3,272	
27	Javy López	8,990	1,570	7,420	
28	Johnny Edwards	8,925	0	8,925	Held National League record, 1972-1980; held the single-season record, 1963-2019
29	Ted Simmons*	8,906	1,330	7,576	
30	Yogi Berra*	8,738	8,723	15	Held major league record, 1959-1969; held AL record, 1959-1973
31	**Christian Vázquez (683)**	8,460	8,460	0	
32	Yan Gomes	8,378	5,203	3,175	Held AL single-season record, 2014-2019
33	Buster Posey	8,359	0	8,359	
33	Mike Scioscia	8,335	0	8,335	
35	Tim McCarver	8,206	55	8,151	
36	Bengie Molina	8,122	4,989	3,133	
37	Dan Wilson	8,109	7,921	188	Held AL single-season record, 1997-2014
38	Jerry Grote	8,081	87	7,994	
39	Jonathan Lucroy	8,041	2,183	5,858	
40	Bill Dickey*	7,965	7,965	0	Held major league record, 1942-1959; held AL record, 1942-1959
41	Mike Lieberthal	7,829	0	7,829	
42	Matt Wieters	7,697	5,597	2,100	
43	Carlos Ruiz	7,668	282	7,386	
44	Sandy Alomar Jr.	7,667	7,335	332	
45	Joe Girardi	7,619	2,626	4,993	
46	Chris Iannetta	7,613	3,310	4,303	
47	Miguel Montero	7,516	192	7,324	
48	Roy Campanella*	7,507	0	6,550	Includes 957 in Negro National League (incomplete); held single-season record, 1953-1959
49	Jim Hegan	7,506	7,170	336	
50	Terry Steinbach	7,505	7,505	0	
51	**Travis d'Arnaud (221)**	7,393	1,332	6,061	
52	Rick Dempsey	7,367	6,556	811	
53	Del Crandall	7,352	304	7,048	
54	Gabby Hartnett*	7,292	0	7,292	Held major league record, 1941-1942; held NL record, 1936-1966
55	Wilson Ramos	7,256	1,311	5,945	
56	Rick Ferrell*	7,248	7,248	0	
57	Charles Johnson	7,218	1,582	5,636	
58	**James McCann (315)**	7,196	5,210	1,986	
59	Ray Schalk*	7,168	7,161	7	Held major league record, 1925-1941; held AL record 1920-1942
60	Mike Matheny	7,117	1,860	5,257	
61	Alan Ashby	7,086	1,991	5,095	
62	Sherm Lollar	7,059	7,059	0	
63	Tom Haller	7,012	220	6,792	
64	Deacon McGuire	6,856	1,661	4,041	Includes 1,154 in American Association; held major league record, 1901-1925
65	Mike Zunino	6,832	6,832	0	
66	**Austin Hedges (640)**	6,831	3,186	3,645	
67	Rod Barajas	6,768	3,416	3,352	
68	Darrell Porter	6,756	4,497	2,259	
69	John Buck	6,733	4,264	2,469	
70	Damian Miller	6,696	786	5,910	
71	Darrin Fletcher	6,678	2,992	3,686	
72	Miguel Olivo	6,675	3,950	2,725	
73	Alex Avila	6,658	5,373	1,285	
74	Al López*	6,644	144	6,500	
75	Terry Kennedy	6,555	1,082	5,473	
76	Rick Cerone	6,548	5,634	914	
77	Todd Hundley	6,535	0	6,535	
78	Elston Howard	6,447	6,447	0	Held AL single-season record, 1964-1967
79	Mickey Cochrane*	6,414	6,414	0	
80	Tucker Barnhart	6,391	690	5,701	
81	Jason Castro	6,323	5,264	1,059	
82	Paul Lo Duca	6,311	0	6,311	
83	Jeff Mathis	6,294	3,843	2,451	
84	Butch Wynegar	6,281	6,281	0	
85	Thurman Munson	6,253	6,253	0	
86	Brent Mayne	6,186	3,706	2,480	
87	Earl Battey	6,176	6,176	0	Held AL single-season record, 1961-1964
88	**Will Smith (578)**	6,163	0	6,163	
89	Don Slaught	6,158	3,911	2,247	
90	Gregg Zaun	6,134	4,465	1,669	
91	Dioner Navarro	6,113	4,651	1,462	
92	Steve Yeager	6,110	234	5,876	
93	Ernie Whitt	6,091	5,795	296	
94	Joe Oliver	6,059	1,329	4,730	
95	Nick Hundley	6,045	529	5,516	
96	José Molina	6,033	5,989	44	
97	Michael Barrett	6,020	34	5,986	
98	**Gary Sánchez (323)**	5,998	4,896	1,102	
99	Manny Sanguillén	5,996	341	5,655	
100	Brian Schneider	5,987	0	5,987	

=== First Basemen ===
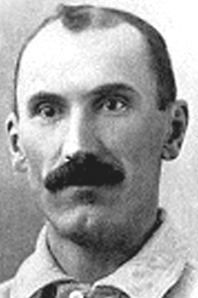
Jake Beckley, the all-time leader in career putouts by a first baseman.

First base, or 1B, is the first of four stations on a baseball diamond which must be touched in succession by a baserunner to score a run for that player's team. A first baseman is the player on the team playing defense who fields the area nearest first base and is responsible for the majority of plays made at that base. In the numbering system used to record defensive plays, the first baseman is assigned the number 3.

The great majority of putouts recorded by first basemen result from their fielding a throw from one of the other three infielders or the pitcher on a ground out. Because of the frequency of ground outs, first basemen typically accumulate higher putout totals than players at any other position, and they often benefit in this area from the defensive skill of the other infielders. Other ways in which first basemen often record a putout include catching a pop-up or line drive, fielding a ground ball close enough to first base that they can step on the bag before the batter/runner arrives, tagging a runner on a pickoff play, receiving a throw to retire a runner who fails to tag up on a fly ball out, receiving a throw to retire a batter/runner on a bunt (often a sacrifice hit), and tagging a runner stranded between bases in a rundown play. Occasionally, a first baseman can record two putouts on a single play; with a runner taking a lead off first base and less than two out, the first baseman can catch a line drive near the base, then step on the bag before the runner can return, completing a double play. On two occasions in major league history, a first baseman has recorded three putouts on a single play for an unassisted triple play: On September 14, 1923, George Burns of the Boston Red Sox accomplished the feat in the second inning against the Cleveland Indians by catching a line drive, tagging the runner off first base, then sprinting to step on second base before the runner off that base could return. And on May 31, 1927, Johnny Neun of the Detroit Tigers completed a triple play in the same way, also against the Indians, securing a 1-0 victory in the ninth inning.

As strikeout totals have risen in baseball, the frequency of other defensive outs including ground outs has declined; as a result, putout totals for first basemen have likewise declined, and ten of the top eleven career leaders ended their careers before 1961. Through 2021, only two of the top 31 single-season totals have been recorded since 1927, and only 27 of the top 125 since 1945. Jake Beckley is the all-time leader in career putouts as a first baseman with 23,755. Cap Anson (21,699), Ed Konetchy (21,361), Eddie Murray (21,255), and Charlie Grimm (20,711) are the only other players to record 20,000 career putouts.

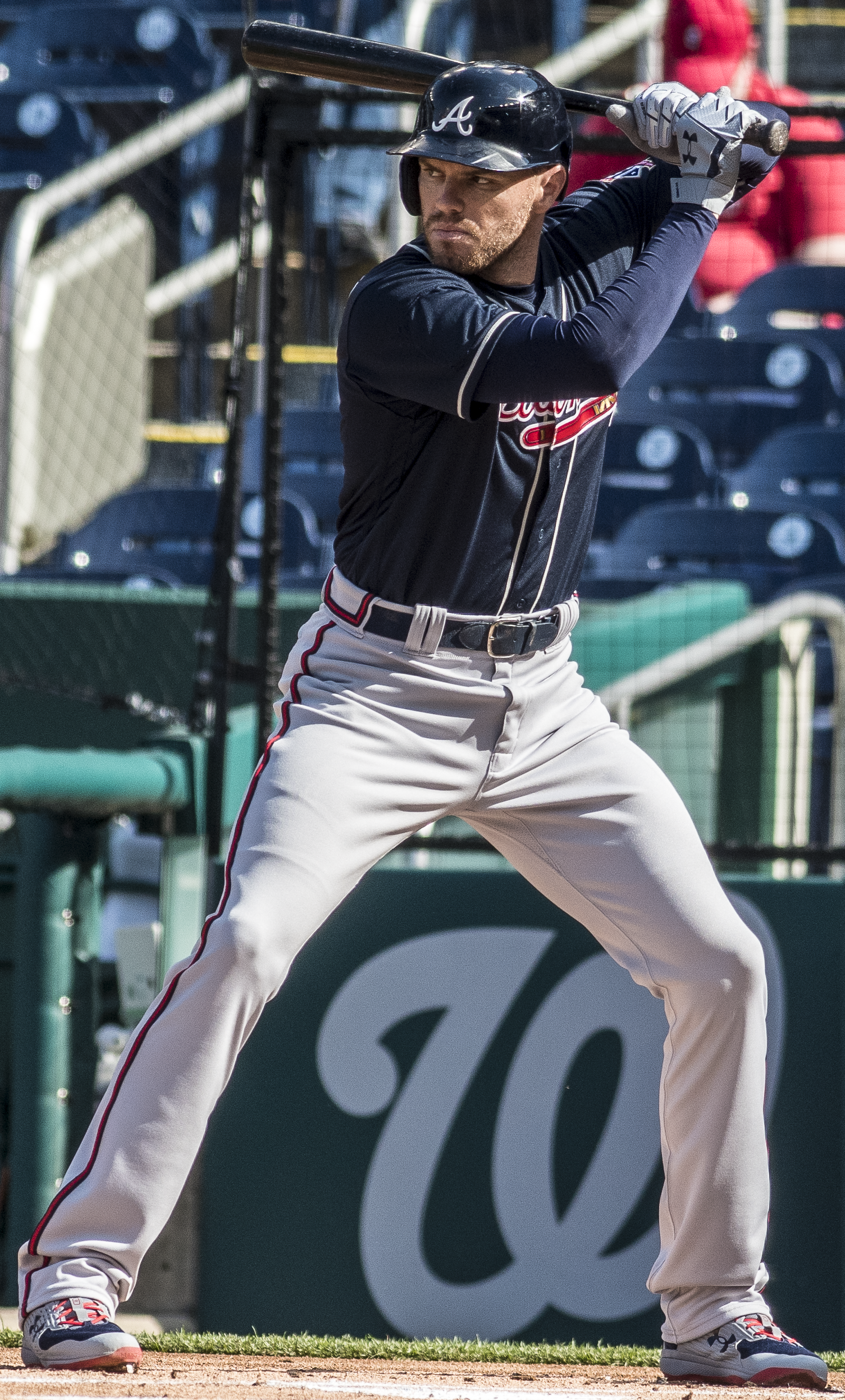
Freddy Freeman, the active leader in putouts as a first baseman and 24th all-time.

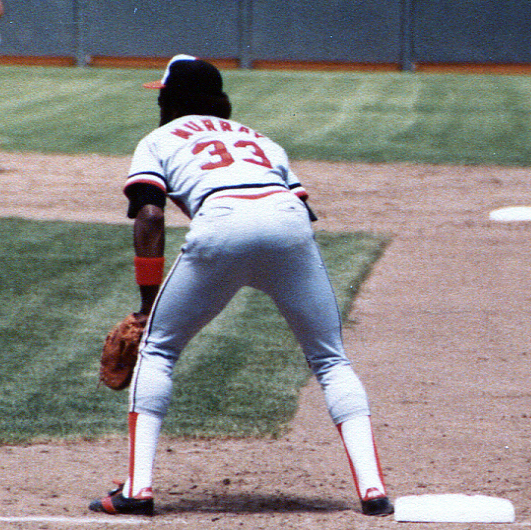
Eddie Murray has the most putouts of any first baseman since 1960.

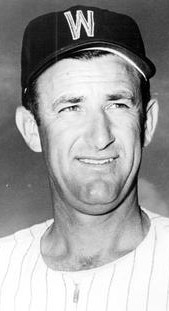
Mickey Vernon holds the American League career record.

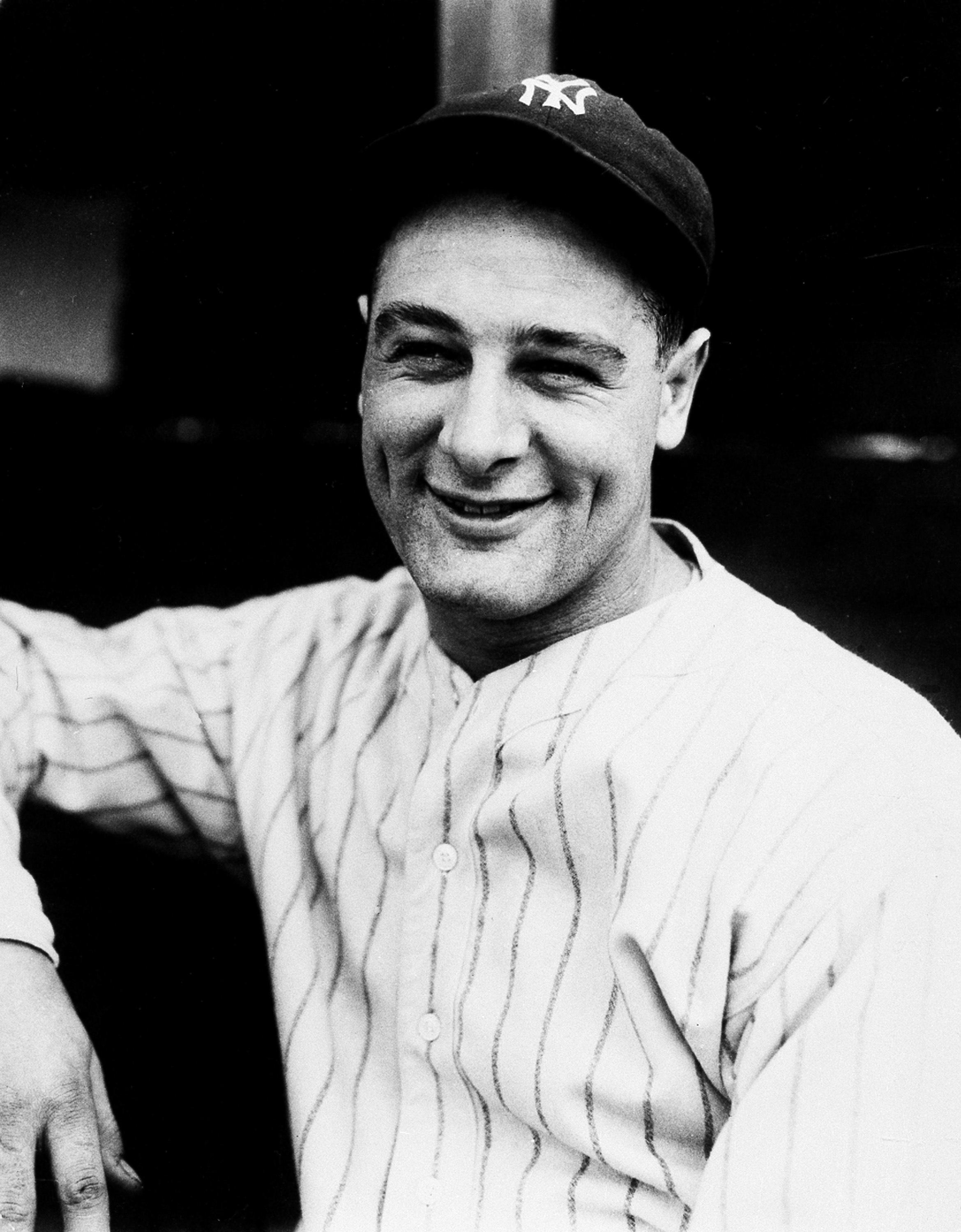
Lou Gehrig held the American League record for 20 years.

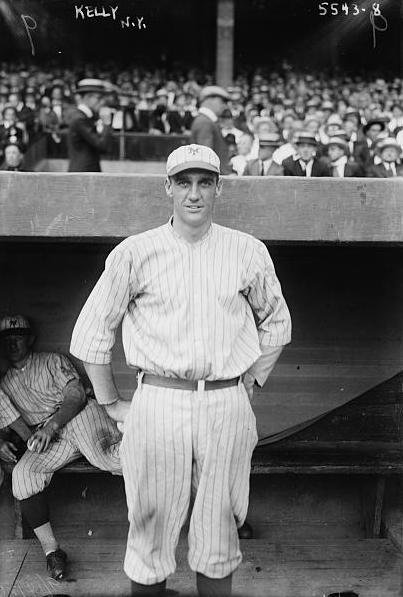
George Kelly's 1,759 putouts in 1920 remain a National League record.

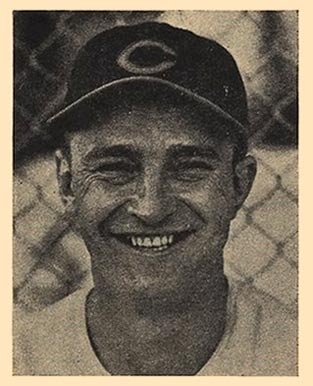
Frank McCormick was one of four players who led the major leagues in putouts five times.

- Stats updated as September 27, 2026

Rank	Player (2026 POs)	Putouts as a first baseman			Other leagues, notes
Rank	Player (2026 POs)	MLB	American League	National League	Other leagues, notes
1	Jake Beckley*	23,755	0	22,475	Includes 1,280 in Players' League; held single-season record, 1892-1898
2	Cap Anson*	21,699	0	20,798	Includes 901 in National Association; held major league record, 1888-1905; held NL record, 1887-1905; held single-season record, 1884-1886; held NL single-season record, 1884-1886, 1889-1891
3	Ed Konetchy	21,361	0	19,825	Includes 1,536 in Federal League; held National League single-season record, 1911-1920
4	Eddie Murray*	21,255	14,830	6,425	
5	Charlie Grimm	20,711	0	20,711	
6	Stuffy McInnis	19,962	16,349	3,613	Held American League record, 1920-1928
7	Mickey Vernon	19,808	19,754	54	
8	Jake Daubert	19,634	0	19,634	
9	Lou Gehrig*	19,510	19,510	0	Held American League record, 1938-1958
10	Joe Kuhel	19,386	19,386	0	
11	Joe Judge	19,264	19,021	243	Held American League record, 1930-1938
12	Fred McGriff*	18,985	8,259	10,726	
13	Todd Helton*	18,889	0	18,889	
14	Steve Garvey	18,844	0	18,844	
15	George Sisler*	18,837	15,336	3,501	
16	Wally Pipp	18,779	15,251	3,528	
17	Mark Grace	18,503	0	18,503	
18	Jim Bottomley*	18,337	1,429	16,908	
19	Andrés Galarraga	18,244	204	18,040	
20	Hal Chase	18,185	11,792	4,243	Includes 2,150 in Federal League
21	Keith Hernandez	17,909	340	17,569	
22	Fred Tenney	17,903	0	17,903	Held National League single-season record, 1905-1906, 1908-1911
23	Chris Chambliss	17,771	11,219	6,552	
24	**Freddie Freeman (1,015)**	17,748	0	17,748	
25	Rafael Palmeiro	17,738	17,596	142	
26	Roger Connor*	17,612	0	16,277	Includes 1,335 in Players' League; held NL single-season record, 1887-1888
27	Jeff Bagwell*	17,545	0	17,545	
28	Jimmie Foxx*	17,207	16,426	781	
29	Willie McCovey*	17,170	0	17,170	
30	Albert Pujols	17,049	4,662	12,387	
31	George Burns	16,892	16,892	0	Held American League record, 1928-1930
32	**Paul Goldschmidt (521)**	16,825	1,361	15,464	
33	Will Clark	16,695	6,117	10,578	
34	Tommy Tucker	16,401	0	12,557	Includes 3,844 in American Association; held single-season record, 1898-1904; held NL single-season record, 1898-1905
35	Dan Brouthers*	16,386	0	13,865	Includes 1,313 in American Association, 1,208 in Players' League; held NL single-season record, 1883-1884
36	John Olerud	16,165	12,271	3,894	
37	Wally Joyner	16,081	11,926	4,155	
38	Bill Terry*	15,972	0	15,972	
39	Paul Konerko	15,936	15,725	211	
40	Harry Davis	15,666	13,423	2,243	Held American League record, 1906-1920
41	Lu Blue	15,644	15,642	2	
42	Fred Merkle	15,419	34	15,385	
43	George Scott	15,405	15,405	0	
44	Gil Hodges*	15,344	0	15,344	
45	Norm Cash	15,157	15,157	0	
46	Carlos Delgado	15,144	10,236	4,908	
47	Tino Martinez	15,001	12,755	2,246	
48	Adrián González	14,962	2,350	12,612	
49	Mark Teixeira	14,942	13,485	1,457	
50	Derrek Lee	14,910	713	14,197	
51	Johnny Mize*	14,850	1,500	13,350	
52	Joey Votto	14,722	0	14,722	
53	Tony Pérez*	14,481	1,825	12,656	
54	Orlando Cepeda*	14,459	0	14,459	
55	Mark McGwire	14,451	10,285	4,166	
56	George Kelly*	14,232	0	14,232	Holds NL single-season record
57	Don Mattingly	14,148	14,148	0	
58	Eric Karros	14,056	165	13,891	
59	Bill Buckner	13,901	4,482	9,419	
60	Charles Comiskey*	13,832	0	2,705	Includes 10,245 in American Association, 882 in Players' League; held the single-season record, 1883-1884
61	Frank McCormick	13,798	0	13,798	
62	Kent Hrbek	13,725	13,725	0	
63	Dolph Camilli	13,724	505	13,219	
64	Dan McGann	13,694	658	13,036	
65	George McQuinn	13,414	13,078	336	
66	Cecil Cooper	13,361	13,361	0	
67	Elbie Fletcher	13,237	0	13,237	
68	John Mayberry	13,169	12,456	713	
69	Anthony Rizzo	13,128	2,485	10,643	
70	Fred Luderus	13,126	0	13,126	
71	Gus Suhr	13,103	0	13,103	
72	Joe Adcock	13,006	2,921	10,085	
73	Lee May	12,885	3,291	9,594	
74	J. T. Snow	12,855	4,063	8,792	
75	Kitty Bransfield	12,797	0	12,797	
76	Bill White	12,735	0	12,735	
77	George Stovall	12,709	10,091	0	Includes 2,618 in Federal League
78	Ted Kluszewski	12,652	1,065	11,587	
79	Dick Hoblitzell	12,584	4,430	8,154	
80	Eric Hosmer	12,554	8,344	4,210	
81	Jack Fournier	12,375	3,249	9,126	
82	Ryan Howard	12,351	0	12,351	
83	Candy LaChance	12,330	6,202	6,128	Held American League record, 1902-1906; held the single-season record, 1904-1906; held AL single-season record, 1902-1906
84	Walter Holke	12,158	0	12,158	
85	Boog Powell	12,130	12,115	15	
86	Hal Trosky	12,124	12,124	0	
87	Adam LaRoche	12,072	380	11,692	
88	Earl Sheely	12,067	9,401	2,666	
89	Bill Skowron	12,043	11,525	518	
90	Ernie Banks*	12,005	0	12,005	
91	Jason Thompson	11,818	6,114	5,704	
92	Lyle Overbay	11,755	7,004	4,751	
93	Earl Torgeson	11,680	3,299	8,381	
94	Pete O'Brien	11,651	11,651	0	
95	Phil Cavarretta	11,375	264	11,111	
96	Rudy York	11,359	11,359	0	
97	**Carlos Santana (59)**	11,279	9,068	2,211	
98	Mike Hargrove	11,274	10,951	323	
99	Justin Morneau	11,239	9,489	1,750	
100	Joe Start	11,197	0	8,691	Includes 2,506 in National Association; held major league record, 1877-1888; held NL record, 1877-1887; held single-season record, 1880-1883

=== Second Basemen ===
Bid McPhee, the all-time leader in career putouts by a second baseman.

In baseball and softball, the second baseman is a fielding position in the infield, commonly stationed between second and first base. The second baseman often possesses quick hands and feet, needs the ability to get rid of the ball quickly, and must be able to make the pivot on a double play. In addition, second basemen are almost always right-handed. Only four left-handed throwing players have appeared as second basemen in the major leagues since 1950; one of the four, Gonzalo Márquez, was listed as the second baseman in the starting lineup for two games in 1973, batting in the first inning, but was replaced before his team took the field on defense, and none of the other three players lasted even a complete inning at the position. In the numbering system used to record defensive plays, the second baseman is assigned the number 4.

Putouts are most commonly recorded by second basemen by stepping on second base after receiving a throw from another infielder or the pitcher to force out a runner on a ground out, often beginning a double play; a second baseman generally benefits in this respect from playing alongside an excellent shortstop with great range and quickness. Other ways in which second basemen often record a putout include catching a pop-up or line drive, fielding a ground ball close enough to second base that they can step on the bag for a force out before the runner advances from first base, tagging a runner after a throw from the catcher or pitcher on a stolen base attempt or a pickoff play, receiving a throw from an outfielder to tag out a runner trying to stretch a single into a double, receiving a throw to retire a runner who fails to tag up on a fly ball out, receiving a throw to force out a runner on a bunt (possibly a sacrifice hit attempt), and tagging a runner stranded between bases in a rundown play. Sometimes a second baseman will record a putout while covering first base if the first baseman is charging toward the plate on an expected bunt. Occasionally, a second baseman can record two putouts on a single play; with a runner taking a lead off second base and less than two out, the second baseman can catch a line drive near the base, then step on the bag before the runner can return, completing a double play; alternately, if a runner on first base breaks for second base when the ball is hit, the second baseman can catch a line drive and tag the runner before they can stop and return to first. On five occasions in major league history, a second baseman has recorded three putouts on a single play for an unassisted triple play, always by catching a line drive, then stepping on second base and tagging the runner advancing from first base (one of the five tagged the runner before stepping on the bag). The first and most famous of these occurred in Game Five of the 1920 World Series, when Cleveland Indians second baseman Bill Wambsganss accomplished the feat in the fifth inning.

As strikeout totals have risen in baseball, the frequency of other defensive outs including ground outs has declined; as a result, putout totals for second basemen have likewise declined, and seven of the top eight career leaders began their careers before 1961. Through 2021, only five of the top 19 single-season totals have been recorded since 1936, only eight of the top 70 since 1962, and only two of the top 154 since 1980; only four of the top 500 have been recorded since 2000. Bid McPhee, who retired in 1899 and is the only second baseman ever to record 500 putouts in a season, is the all-time leader in career putouts as a second baseman with 6,552. Eddie Collins (6,526) and Nellie Fox (6,090) are the only other second basemen with over 6,000 career putouts.

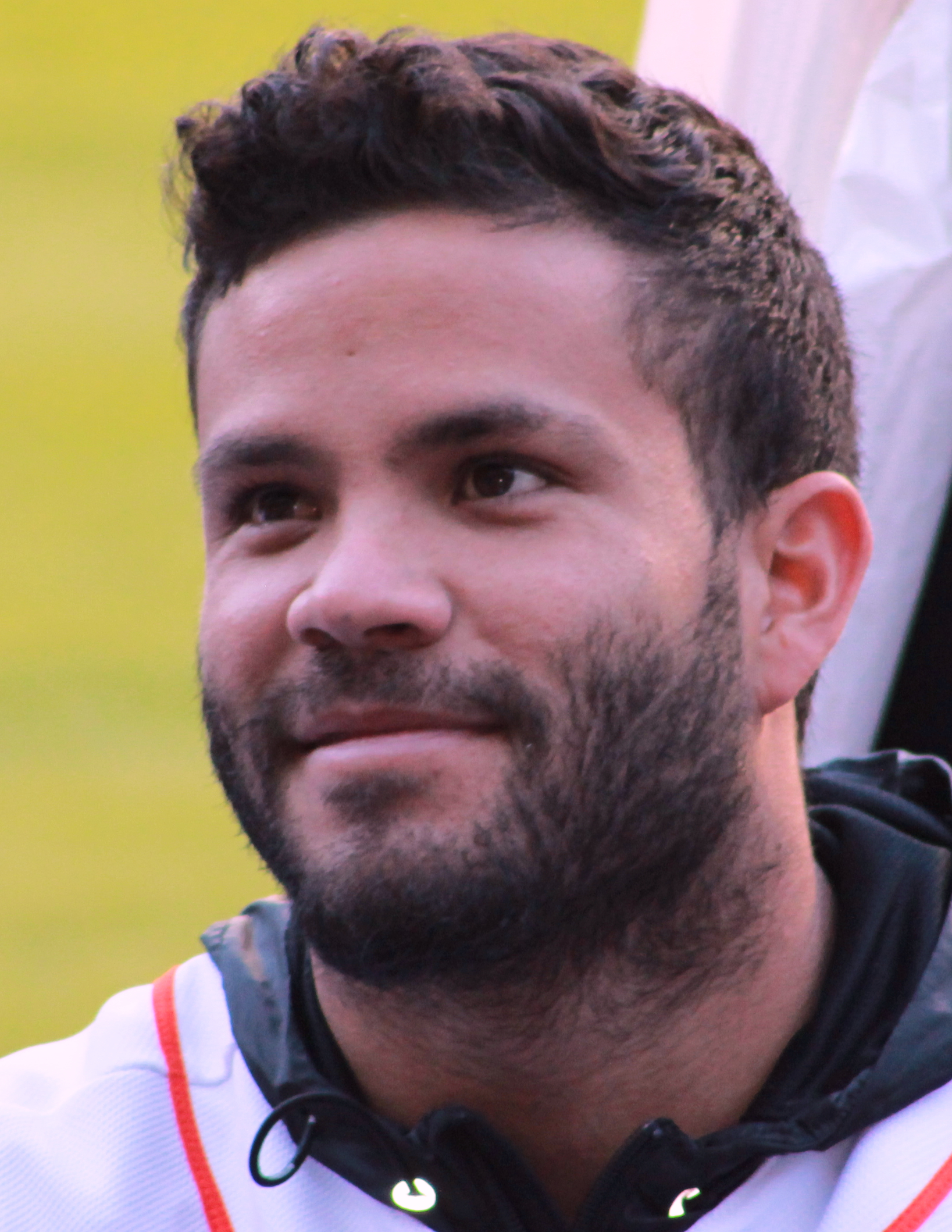
Jose Altuve, the active leader in putouts as a second baseman and 77th all-time.

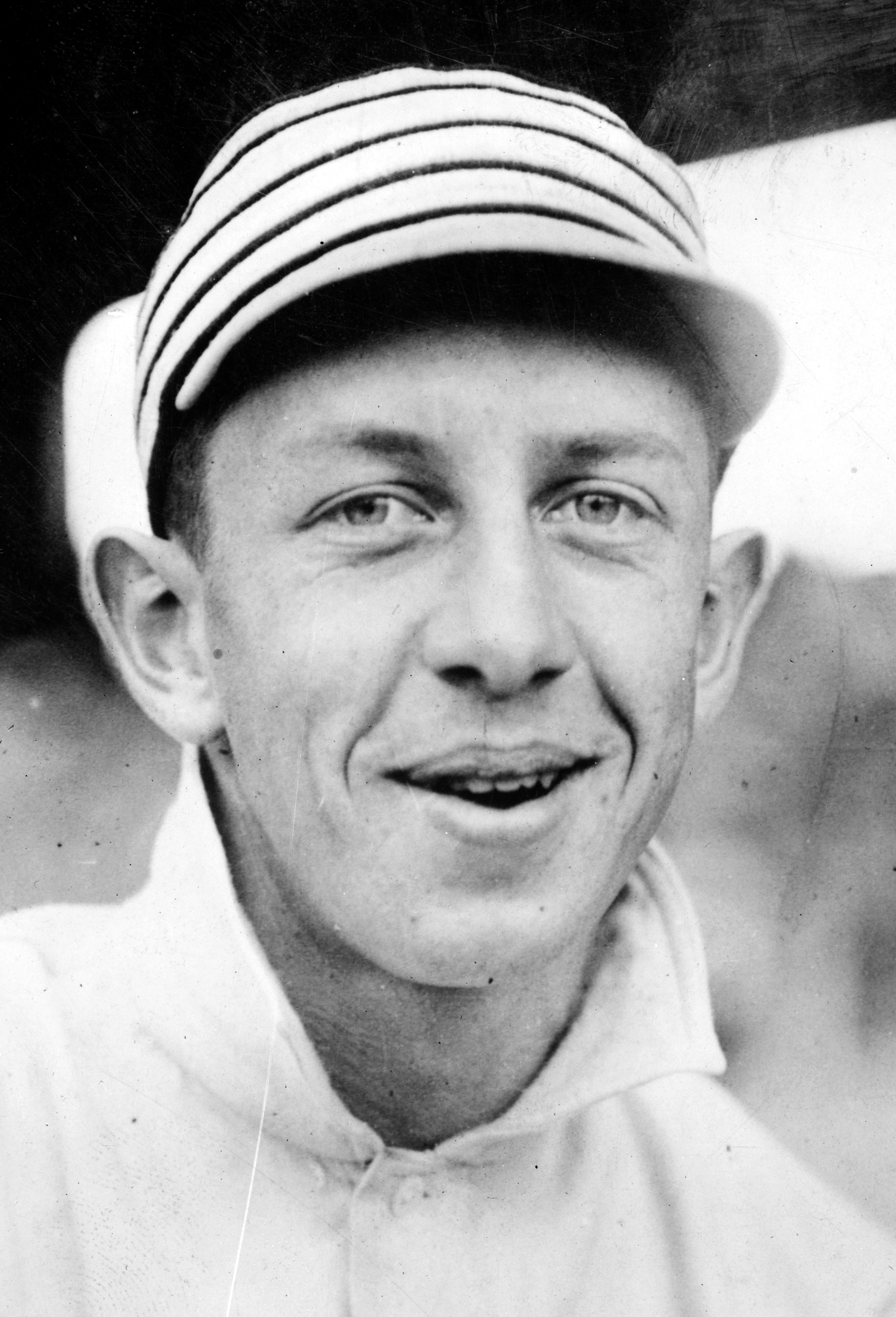
Eddie Collins holds the American League career record.

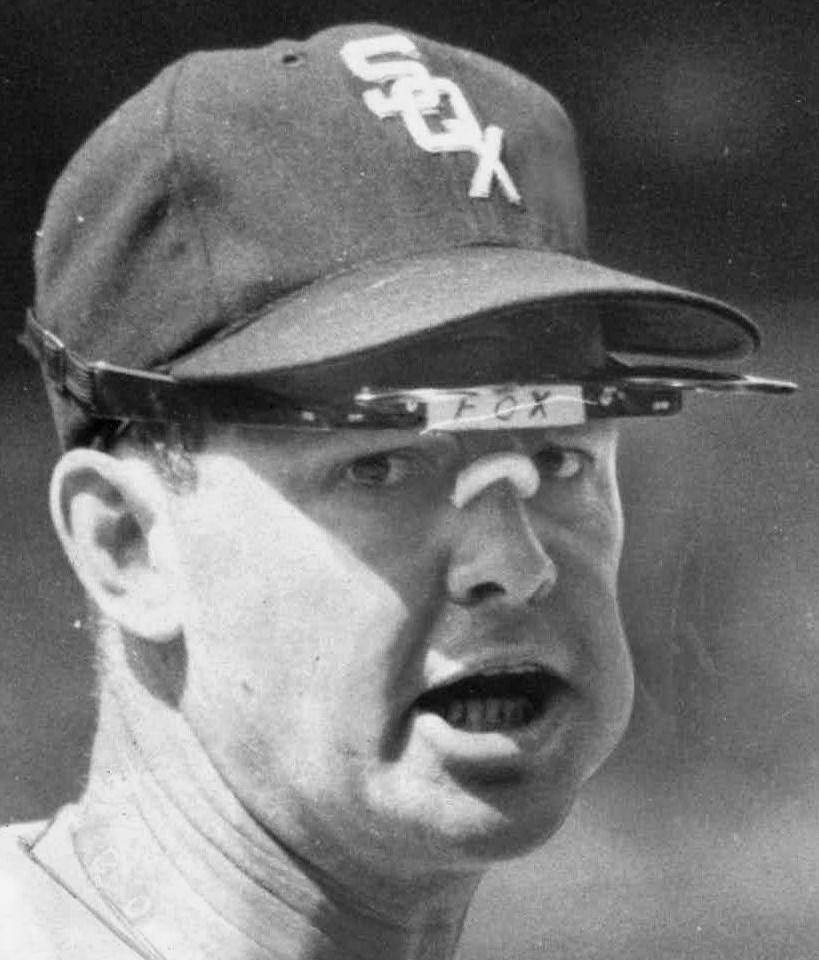
Nellie Fox led the American League in putouts a record ten consecutive seasons.

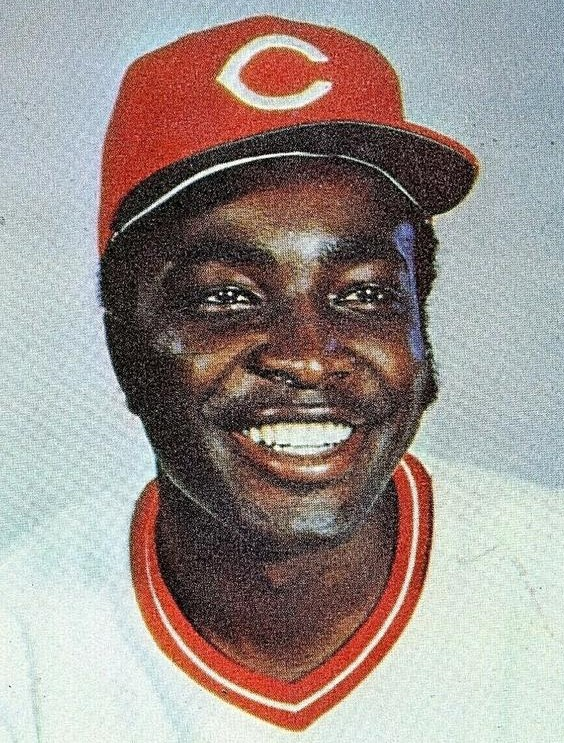
Joe Morgan holds the National League career record.

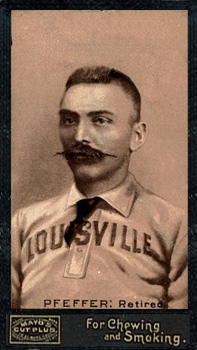
Fred Pfeffer held the National League career record for 47 years.

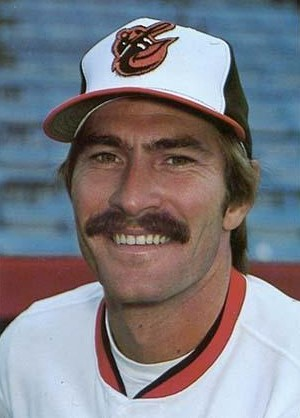
Bobby Grich's 484 putouts in 1974 are the most by any second baseman since 1900.

- Stats updated as of September 27, 2026.

Rank	Player (2026 POs)	Putouts as a second baseman			Other leagues, notes
Rank	Player (2026 POs)	MLB	American League	National League	Other leagues, notes
1	Bid McPhee*	6,552	0	3,441	Includes 3,111 in American Association; holds the single-season record of 529 (set in 1886)
2	Eddie Collins*	6,526	6,526	0	
3	Nellie Fox*	6,090	5,859	231	
4	Joe Morgan*	5,742	201	5,541	
5	Nap Lajoie*	5,496	4,543	953	Held American League record, 1901-1902, 1903-1904, 1908-1921; held AL single-season record, 1901-1905, 1908-1922
6	Charlie Gehringer*	5,369	5,369	0	
7	Bill Mazeroski*	4,974	0	4,974	Held National League record, 1970-1981
8	Bobby Doerr*	4,928	4,928	0	
9	Willie Randolph	4,859	4,366	493	
10	Billy Herman*	4,780	0	4,780	Held National League record, 1943-1970; holds the NL single-season record (466 in 1933)
11	Lou Whitaker	4,771	4,771	0	
12	Frank White	4,742	4,742	0	
13	Fred Pfeffer	4,719	0	4,278	Includes 441 in Players' League; held National League record, 1889-1936; held NL single-season record, 1884-1912
14	Red Schoendienst*	4,616	0	4,616	
15	Roberto Alomar*	4,458	3,028	1,430	
16	Frankie Frisch*	4,348	0	4,348	Held National League record, 1936-1943
17	Bobby Grich	4,217	4,217	0	Holds the American League single-season record (484 in 1974)
18	Del Pratt	4,069	4,069	0	
19	Robinson Canó	4,066	3,841	225	
20	Jeff Kent*	4,016	35	3,981	
21	Craig Biggio*	3,992	0	3,992	
22	Kid Gleason	3,887	655	3,232	
23	Cupid Childs	3,865	0	3,493	Includes 372 in American Association
24	Ryne Sandberg*	3,807	0	3,807	
25	George Cutshaw	3,762	437	3,325	
26	Johnny Evers*	3,758	3	3,755	
27	Lou Bierbauer	3,726	0	1,828	Includes 1,526 in American Association, 372 in Players' League
28	Larry Doyle	3,635	0	3,635	
29	Joe Gordon*	3,600	3,600	0	
30	Steve Sax	3,574	1,199	2,375	
31	Brandon Phillips	3,548	304	3,244	
32	Ray Durham	3,506	2,126	1,380	
33	Félix Millán	3,495	0	3,495	
34	Buddy Myer	3,487	3,487	0	
35	Cub Stricker	3,447	0	843	Includes 2,309 in American Association, 295 in Players' League
36	Hughie Critz	3,446	0	3,446	
37	Claude Ritchey	3,444	0	3,444	
38	Bret Boone	3,443	1,465	1,978	
39	Ski Melillo	3,437	3,437	0	
40	Chase Utley	3,426	0	3,426	
41	Miller Huggins*	3,425	0	3,425	
42	Frank Bolling	3,423	1,863	1,560	
43	Bucky Harris*	3,412	3,412	0	Held the American League single-season record, 1922-1974
44	Manny Trillo	3,403	218	3,185	
45	Ian Kinsler	3,397	3,301	96	
46	Julián Javier	3,380	0	3,380	
47	Tony Lazzeri*	3,351	3,315	36	
48	Bobby Lowe	3,336	396	2,940	
49	Joe Quinn	3,329	158	2,730	Includes 441 in Players' League
50	Luis Castillo	3,287	421	2,866	
51	Tony Taylor	3,274	369	2,905	
52	Jerry Priddy	3,226	3,226	0	
53	Rogers Hornsby*	3,206	31	3,175	
54	Dave Cash	3,185	0	3,185	
55	Johnny Temple	3,172	549	2,623	
56	Davey Lopes	3,142	563	2,579	
57	Jim Gantner	3,139	3,139	0	
58	Bobby Richardson	3,125	3,125	0	
59	Cookie Rojas	3,100	1,630	1,470	
60	Jack Burdock	3,075	0	2,522	Includes 381 in National Association, 172 in American Association; held major league record, 1878-1889; held NL record, 1876-1889; held single-season record, 1873-1874, 1879-1884; held NL single-season record, 1876-1884
61	Don Blasingame	3,065	780	2,285	
62	Tito Fuentes	3,046	396	2,650	
63	Eddie Stanky	3,030	0	3,030	
64	Bill Wambsganss	2,986	2,986	0	
65	Tom Herr	2,932	140	2,792	
66	Ted Sizemore	2,928	69	2,859	
67	Fred Dunlap	2,909	0	2,559	Includes 341 in Union Association, 8 in American Association, 1 in Players' League
68	Tony Cuccinello	2,883	11	2,872	
69	Davey Johnson	2,837	2,273	564	
70	Bobby Ávila	2,820	2,717	103	
71	Glenn Hubbard	2,795	277	2,518	
72	Joe Gerhardt	2,794	0	1,446	Includes 1,320 in American Association, 28 in National Association
73	Jimmy Williams	2,759	2,759	0	
74	Max Bishop	2,752	2,752	0	
75	Harold Reynolds	2,749	2,749	0	
76	Otto Knabe	2,743	0	2,251	Includes 492 in Federal League
77	**Jose Altuve (143)**	2,737	2,400	337	
78	Ron Hunt	2,734	0	2,734	
79	Glenn Beckert	2,710	0	2,710	
80	Bill Hallman	2,701	0	2,351	Includes 327 in American Association, 23 in Players' League
81	Tommy Helms	2,688	4	2,684	
82	Horace Clarke	2,682	2,642	40	
	Johnny Ray	2,682	766	1,916	
84	Mark Ellis	2,671	2,042	629	
85	Tom Daly	2,652	408	2,244	
86	Orlando Hudson	2,635	1,236	1,399	
87	Eric Young	2,623	41	2,582	
88	Bill Doran	2,619	28	2,591	
89	Robby Thompson	2,611	0	2,611	
89	Delino DeShields	2,608	349	2,259	
91	Ron Oester	2,591	0	2,591	
92	Juan Samuel	2,580	48	2,532	
93	Dustin Pedroia	2,574	2,574	0	
94	Rod Carew*	2,573	2,573	0	
95	Sandy Alomar	2,572	2,517	55	
96	Rennie Stennett	2,568	0	2,568	
97	Bobby Knoop	2,566	2,566	0	
98	Jim Gilliam	2,546	0	2,279	Includes 267 in Negro National League (second) (incomplete)
99	Chuck Knoblauch	2,529	2,529	0	
100	Dick Green	2,518	2,518	0	

=== Third Basemen ===
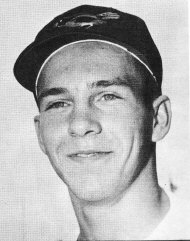
Brooks Robinson, the all-time leader in career putouts by a third baseman.

Third base, or 3B, is the third of four stations on a baseball diamond which must be touched in succession by a baserunner in order to score a run for that player's team. A third baseman is the player on the team playing defense who fields the area nearest third base and is responsible for the majority of plays made at that base. The third baseman requires good reflexes in reacting to batted balls, often being the closest infielder (roughly 90–120 feet) to the batter. The third base position requires a strong and accurate arm, as the third baseman often makes long throws to first base. The third baseman sometimes must throw quickly to second base in time to start a double play, and must also field fly balls in both fair and foul territory. In the scoring system used to record defensive plays, the third baseman is assigned the number 5.

Third basemen typically record putouts by stepping on third base after receiving a throw from another infielder or the pitcher to force out a runner on a ground out, by catching a pop-up or line drive, or by fielding a ground ball close enough to third base that they can step on the bag for a force out before the runner advances from second base. Other ways in which third basemen often record a putout include receiving a throw from an outfielder to tag a runner trying to reach third base, tagging a runner after a throw from the catcher or pitcher on a stolen base attempt or a pickoff play, receiving a throw to retire a runner who fails to tag up on a fly ball out, receiving a throw to force out a runner on a bunt (possibly a sacrifice hit attempt), and tagging a runner stranded between bases in a rundown play. Because fewer runners advance to third base than to the preceding bases, because of the higher difficulty of throwing out a runner taking a lead off second base, and because there are far fewer attempts to steal third base than second base, third basemen generally record far fewer putouts than any other players except pitchers. Occasionally, a third baseman can record two putouts on a single play; with a runner taking a lead off third base and less than two out, the third baseman can catch a line drive near the base, then step on the bag before the runner can return, completing a double play; alternately, if a runner on second base breaks for third base when the ball is hit, the third baseman can catch a line drive and tag the runner before they can stop and return to second.

As strikeout totals have risen in baseball, the frequency of other defensive outs including ground outs has declined; as a result, putout totals for third basemen have likewise declined, and all but three of the top 25 career leaders began their careers prior to 1961 even though career lengths for third basemen have steadily increased since 1920; eight of the top 13 began their careers before 1925. Through 2022, only four of the top 63 single-season totals have been recorded since 1929, only four of the top 138 since 1957, and only six of the top 499 since 1976. Brooks Robinson is the all-time leader in career putouts as a third baseman with 2,697; he is the only third baseman with more than 2,500 career putouts.

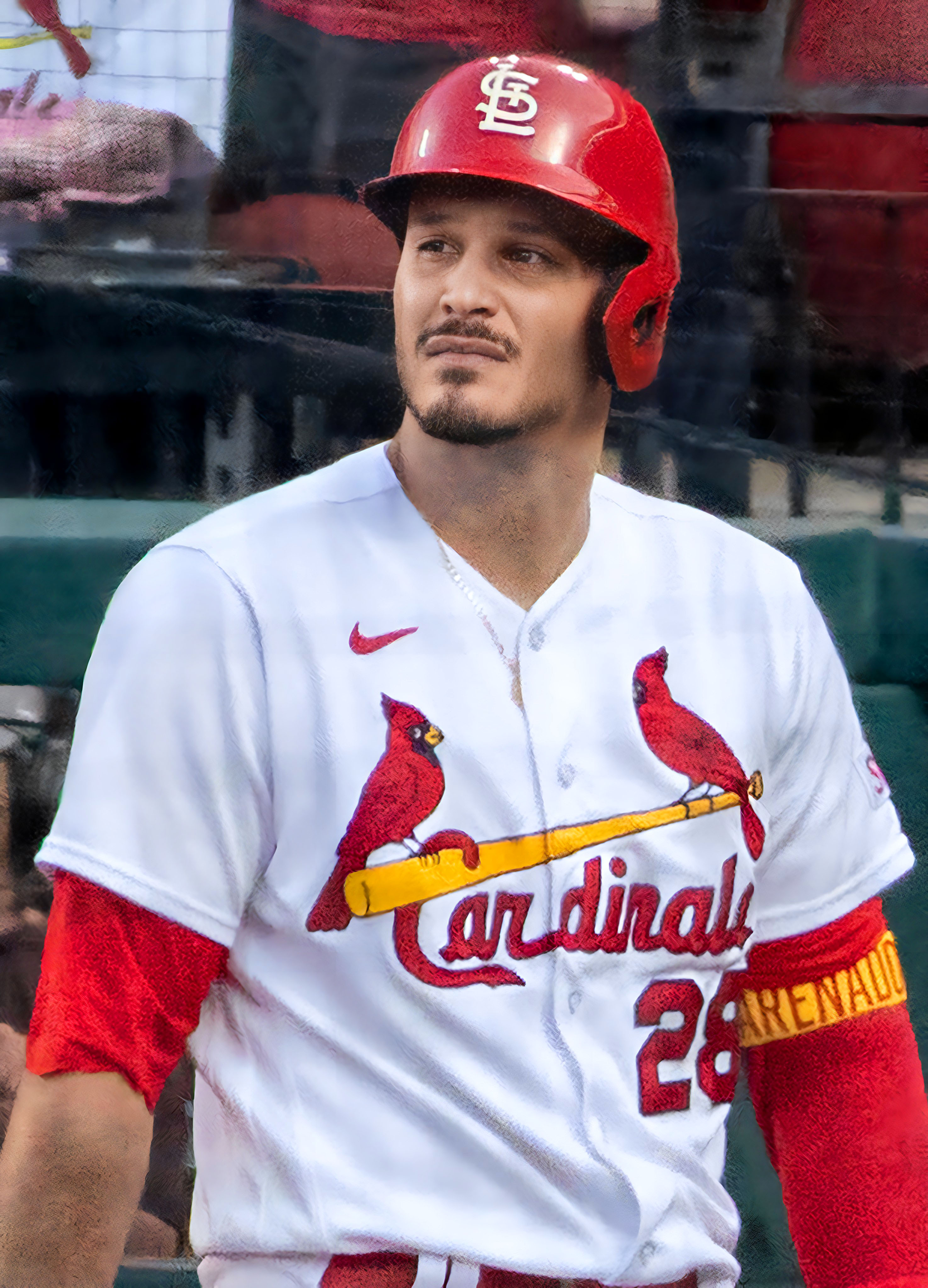
Nolan Arenaldo, the active leader in putouts as a third baseman and 61st all-time.

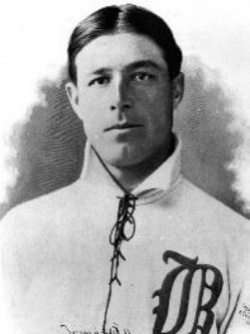
Jimmy Collins held the major league record for 65 years.

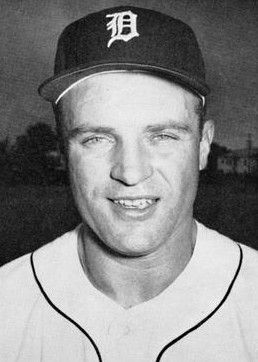
Eddie Yost led the American League in putouts a record eight times.

Pie Traynor holds the National League record.

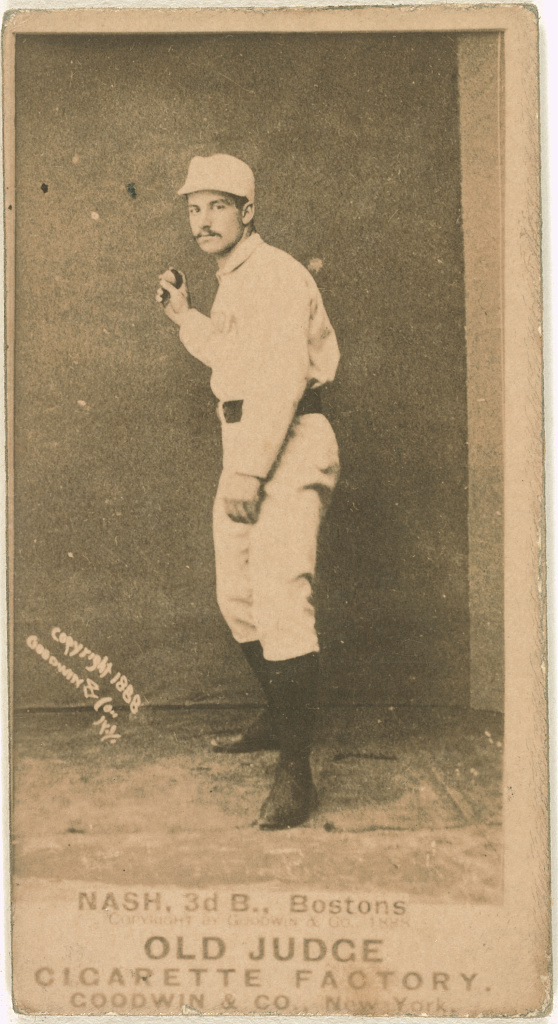
Billy Nash held the National League record for 37 years.

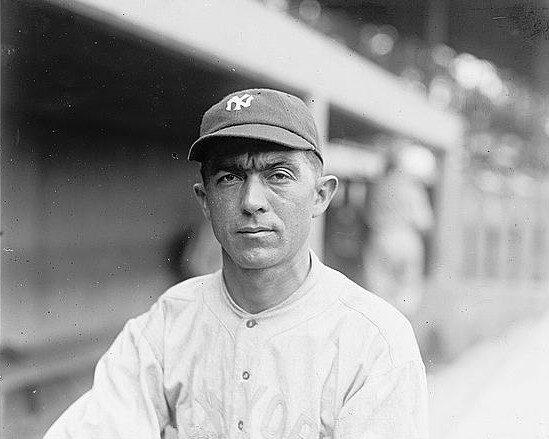
Home Run Baker held the American League record for 41 years.

- Stats updated as of September 27, 2026.

Rank	Player (2026 POs)	Putouts as a third baseman			Other leagues, notes
Rank	Player (2026 POs)	MLB	American League	National League	Other leagues, notes
1	Brooks Robinson*	2,697	2,697	0	
2	Jimmy Collins*	2,372	1,182	1,190	Held major league record, 1908–1973; held American League record, 1904–1905; holds the NL single-season record (251 in 1900; tie)
3	Eddie Yost	2,356	2,356	0	Held American League record, 1960-1973
4	Lave Cross	2,310	999	1,283	Includes 28 in American Association; held major league record, 1906-1908
5	Pie Traynor*	2,289	0	2,289	
6	Billy Nash	2,226	0	1,947	Includes 202 in Players' League, 77 in American Association; held major league record, 1895–1906; held NL record, 1896–1933; held NL single-season record, 1887-1889
7	Adrián Beltré*	2,194	1,475	719	
8	Home Run Baker*	2,154	2,154	0	Held American League record, 1918–1920, 1921–1960; held AL single-season record, 1913-1927
9	Willie Kamm	2,151	2,151	0	Holds the American League single-season record (243 in 1928)
10	Eddie Mathews*	2,049	17	2,032	
11	Willie Jones	2,045	3	2,042	
12	Jimmy Austin	2,042	2,042	0	Held American League record, 1916–1918, 1920-1921
13	Arlie Latham	1,976	0	869	Includes 1,042 in American Association, 65 in Players' League; held major league record, 1894-1895
14	Ron Santo*	1,955	25	1,930	
15	Stan Hack	1,944	0	1,944	
16	Graig Nettles	1,898	1,583	315	
17	Pinky Higgins	1,848	1,848	0	
18	George Kell*	1,825	1,825	0	
19	Billy Shindle	1,815	0	1,370	Includes 443 in American Association, 2 in Players' League
20	Buddy Bell	1,798	1,509	289	
21	Larry Gardner	1,789	1,789	0	
22	Harlond Clift	1,777	1,777	0	
	Jerry Denny	1,777	0	1,777	Held major league record, 1889–1894; held National League record, 1886–1896; held single-season record, 1883–1886; held NL single-season record, 1883-1887
24	Harry Steinfeldt	1,776	0	1,776	
25	Bill Bradley	1,755	1,490	210	Includes 55 in Federal League; held American League record, 1902–1904, 1905-1916
26	Gary Gaetti	1,699	1,458	241	
27	Denny Lyons	1,675	0	726	Includes 949 in American Association; holds the single-season record of 255 (set in 1887)
28	Tim Wallach	1,662	27	1,635	
29	Sal Bando	1,647	1,647	0	
30	Mike Schmidt*	1,591	0	1,591	
31	Ken Keltner	1,576	1,576	0	
32	Ken Boyer	1,567	24	1,543	
33	Ossie Bluege	1,551	1,551	0	
34	Wade Boggs*	1,550	1,550	0	
35	Aurelio Rodríguez	1,529	1,491	38	
36	Ron Cey	1,500	1	1,499	
37	Scott Rolen*	1,478	136	1,342	
38	Robin Ventura	1,471	1,148	323	
39	Clete Boyer	1,470	966	504	
40	Bobby Byrne	1,456	0	1,456	
	Heinie Groh	1,456	0	1,456	
42	Pinky Whitney	1,455	0	1,455	
43	Hick Carpenter	1,450	0	314	Includes 1,136 in American Association; held major league record, 1888–1889; held National League single-season record, 1880-1881
44	Bob Elliott	1,448	105	1,343	
45	Art Devlin	1,399	0	1,399	
46	Milt Stock	1,392	0	1,392	
47	Terry Pendleton	1,386	12	1,374	
48	Carney Lansford	1,382	1,382	0	
49	George Brett*	1,372	1,372	0	
50	Mike Mowrey	1,363	0	1,189	Includes 174 in Federal League
51	Jimmy Dykes	1,361	1,361	0	
52	George Pinkney	1,343	0	535	Includes 808 in American Association; held single-season record, 1886-1887
53	Tommy Leach	1,323	0	1,323	
54	Doc Casey	1,312	307	1,005	
55	Frank Malzone	1,308	1,308	0	
56	Evan Longoria	1,305	1,012	293	
57	Matt Williams	1,293	89	1,204	
58	Hans Lobert	1,292	0	1,292	
59	Eddie Foster	1,289	1,289	0	
60	Darrell Evans	1,273	17	1,256	
61	**Nolan Arenado (100)**	1,270	0	1,270	
61	Bill Coughlin	1,269	1,262	7	Held American League record, 1901–1902; held AL single-season record, 1901-1913
63	Billy Werber	1,264	761	503	
64	**Manny Machado (105)**	1,259	553	706	
	Ken McMullen	1,259	1,194	65	
66	Doug DeCinces	1,256	1,253	3	
67	Ezra Sutton	1,252	0	896	Includes 356 in National Association; held major league record, 1882-1888
68	Ken Caminiti	1,251	42	1,209	
69	Joe Mulvey	1,235	0	919	Includes 172 in American Association, 144 in Players' League
70	Charlie Irwin	1,228	0	1,228	
71	Red Rolfe	1,220	1,220	0	
72	Don Hoak	1,219	0	1,219	
73	Red Smith	1,210	0	1,210	
74	Aramis Ramírez	1,197	0	1,197	
75	Chipper Jones*	1,159	0	1,159	
76	Vinny Castilla	1,156	76	1,080	
77	Mike Lowell	1,140	414	726	
78	Doug Rader	1,138	38	1,100	
79	Joe Dugan	1,099	1,086	13	
80	David Wright	1,087	0	1,087	
81	Jim Tabor	1,077	853	224	
82	**Matt Chapman (54)**	1,070	823	247	
83	Heinie Zimmerman	1,054	0	1,054	
84	Harry Lord	1,046	961	0	Includes 85 in Federal League
85	Bill Joyce	1,044	0	786	Includes 176 in Players' League, 82 in American Association
86	Tom Burns	1,043	0	1,043	Held National League single-season record, 1889-1898
87	Eric Chavez	1,035	1,000	35	
88	Marv Owen	1,032	1,032	0	
89	Frank Hankinson	1,029	0	575	Includes 454 in American Association; held National League single-season record, 1881-1883
90	Ossie Vitt	1,026	1,026	0	
	Art Whitney	1,026	0	612	Includes 285 in American Association, 129 in Players' League
92	Bob Aspromonte	1,025	0	1,025	
	Whitey Kurowski	1,025	0	1,025	
94	Joe Randa	1,005	782	223	
95	Ken Reitz	996	0	996	
96	Harry Wolverton	989	99	890	
97	Grady Hatton	979	191	788	
98	Todd Zeile	974	183	791	
99	Al Rosen	970	970	0	
100	Charlie Deal	967	89	802	Includes 76 in Federal League

=== Shortstop ===
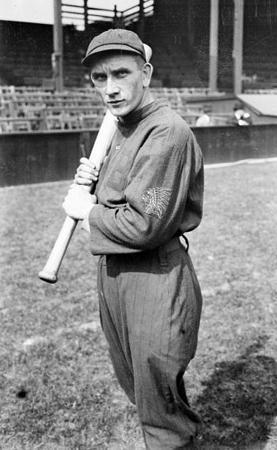
Rabbit Maranville, the all-time leader in putouts by a shortstop.

Shortstop, abbreviated SS, is a baseball or softball fielding position in the infield, commonly stationed between second and third base, which is considered to be among the most demanding defensive positions. The position is mostly filled by defensive specialists, so shortstops are generally relatively poor batters who typically hit lower in the batting order. In the numbering system used to record defensive plays, the shortstop is assigned the number 6.

Putouts are most commonly recorded by shortstops by stepping on second base after receiving a throw from the first baseman, second baseman, or pitcher to force out a runner on a ground out, often beginning a double play; a shortstop generally benefits in this respect from playing alongside an excellent second baseman with great range and quickness. Other ways in which shortstops often record a putout include catching a pop-up or line drive, fielding a ground ball close enough to second base that they can step on the bag for a force out before the runner advances from first base, tagging a runner after a throw from the catcher or pitcher on a stolen base attempt or a pickoff play, receiving a throw from an outfielder to tag out a runner trying to stretch a single into a double, receiving a throw to retire a runner who fails to tag up on a fly ball out, receiving a throw to force out a runner on a bunt (possibly a sacrifice hit attempt), and tagging a runner stranded between bases in a rundown play. Sometimes a shortstop will record a putout while covering third base if the third baseman is charging toward the plate on an expected bunt. Occasionally, a shortstop can record two putouts on a single play; with a runner taking a lead off second base and less than two out, the shortstop can catch a line drive near the base, then step on the bag before the runner can return, completing a double play; alternately, if a runner on first base breaks for second base when the ball is hit, the shortstop can catch a line drive and tag the runner before they can stop and return to first. On eight occasions in major league history, a shortstop has recorded three putouts on a single play for an unassisted triple play, always by catching a line drive, then stepping on second base and tagging the runner advancing from first base.

As strikeout totals have risen in baseball, the frequency of other defensive outs including ground outs has declined; as a result, putout totals for second basemen have likewise declined. The top five career leaders all began their careers prior to 1916, and only four of the top 16 were active after 1950, and only two of them after 1973. Through 2022, only six of the top 40 single-season totals have been recorded since 1922, and none of the top 85 since 1949; none of the top 181 have been recorded since 1964, and only three of the top 485 have been recorded since 1992. Rabbit Maranville is the all-time leader in career putouts as a shortstop with 5,139; he is the only shortstop to record more than 5,000 career putouts.

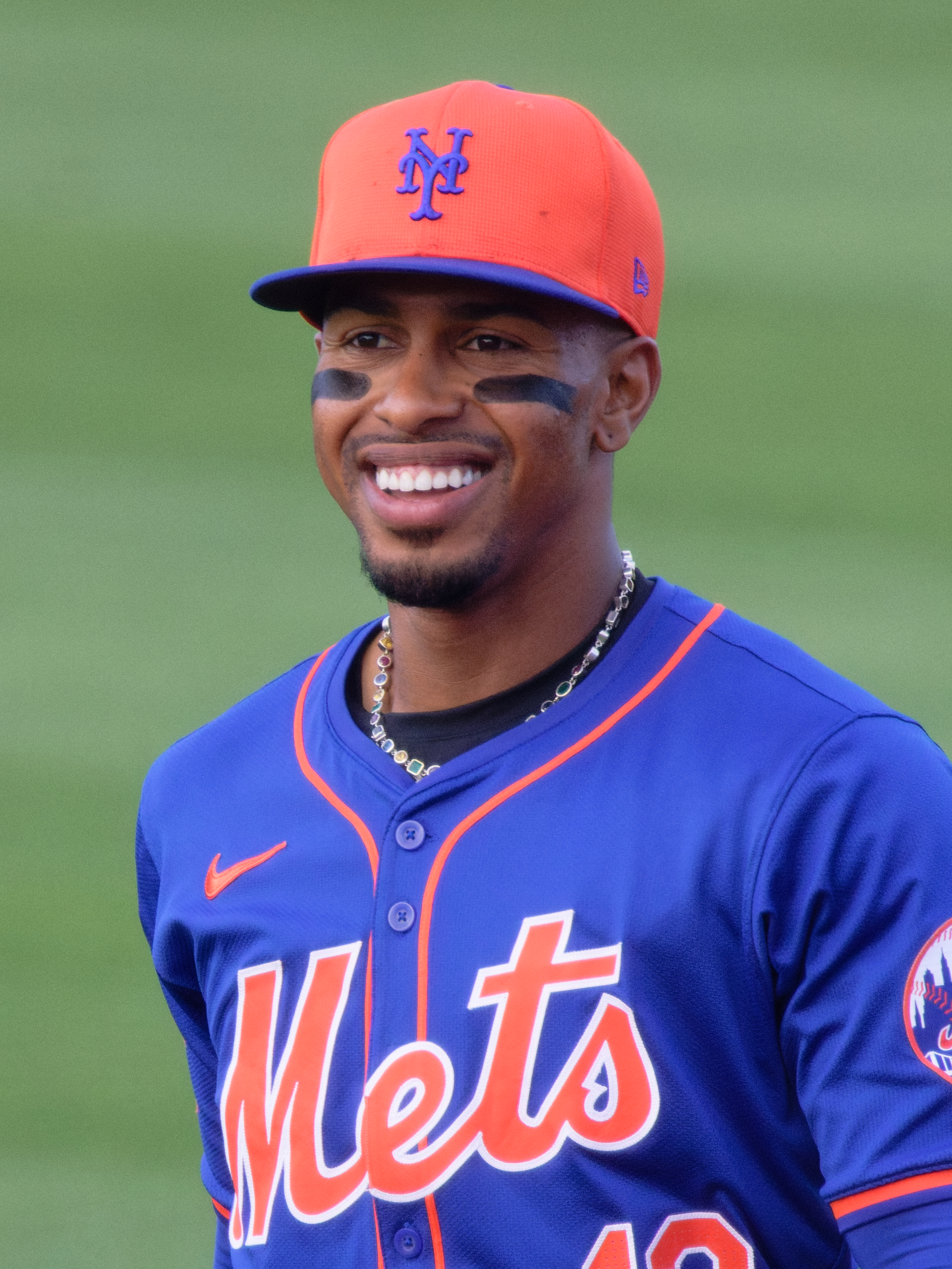
Francisco Lindor, the active leader in putouts by a shortstop and 104th all-time.

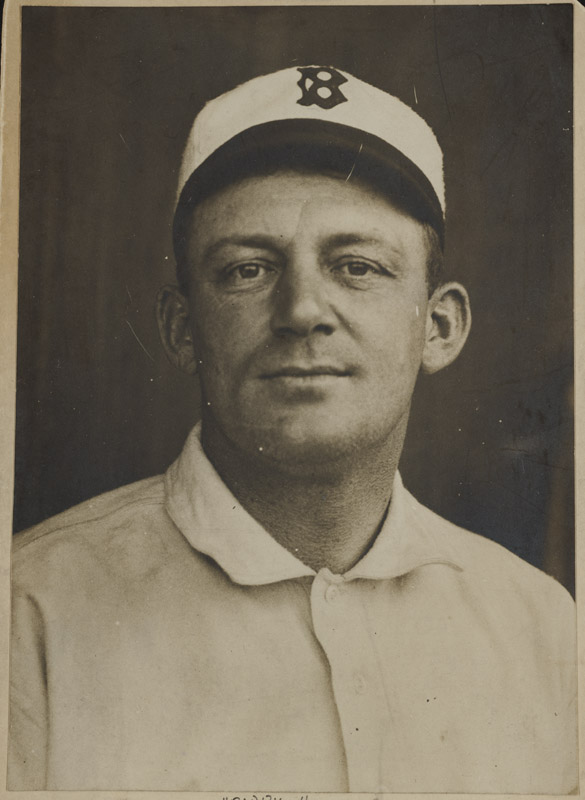
Bill Dahlen held the major league record for 22 years.

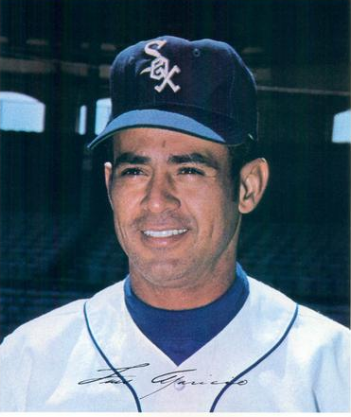
Luis Aparicio holds the American League record.

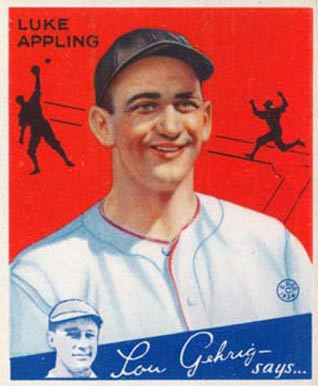
Luke Appling held the American League record for 25 years.

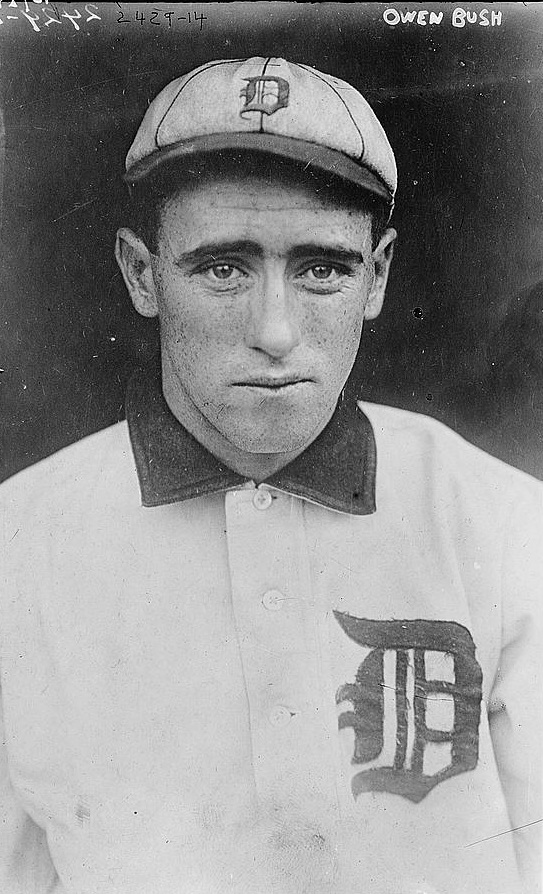
Donie Bush held the American League record for 30 years; his 425 putouts in 1914 are the most by any shortstop since 1900.

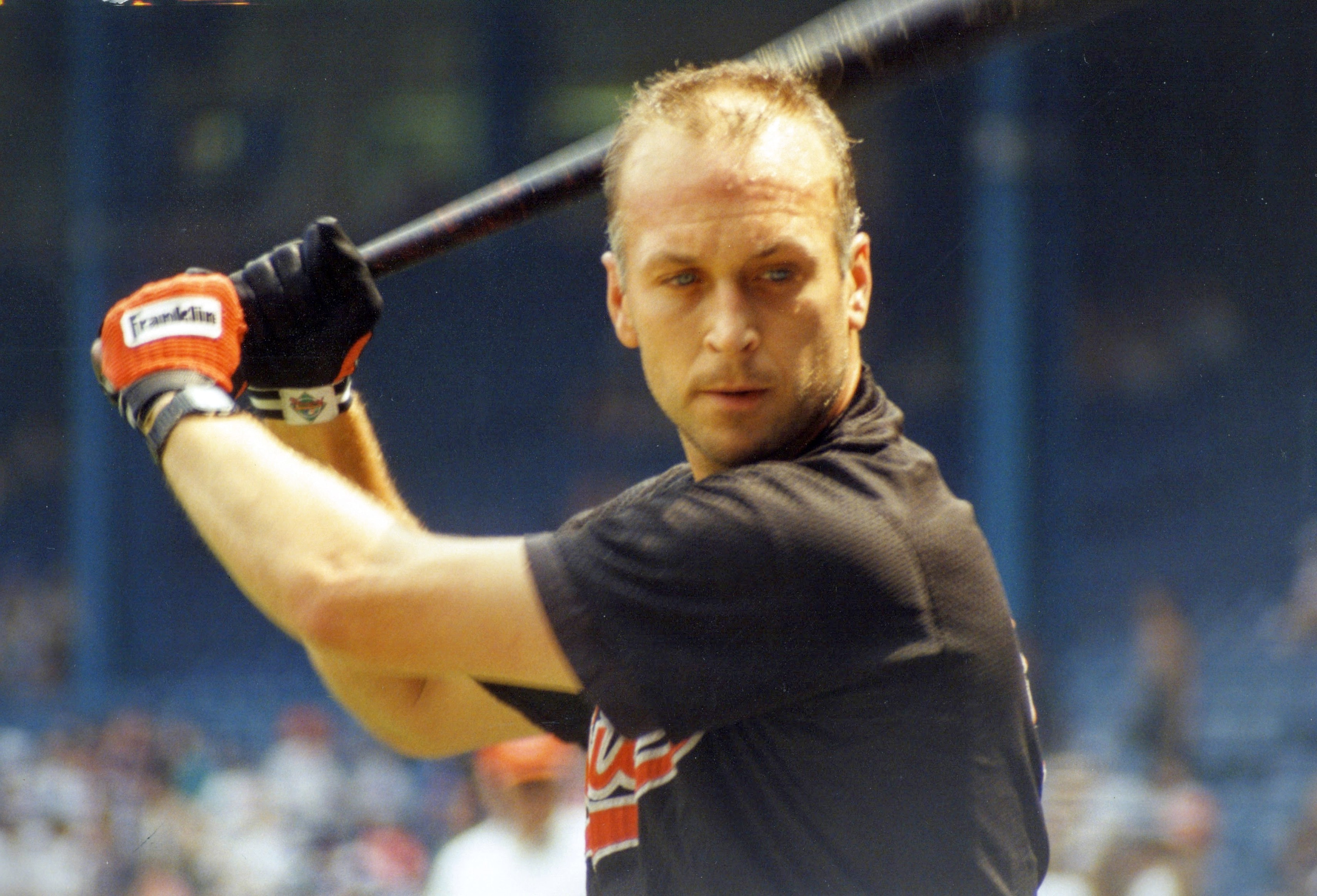
Cal Ripken Jr. led the American League in putouts a record six times.

- Stats updated as of September 27, 2026.

Rank	Player (2026 POs)	Putouts as a shortstop			Other leagues, notes
Rank	Player (2026 POs)	MLB	American League	National League	Other leagues, notes
1	Rabbit Maranville*	5,139	0	5,139	
2	Bill Dahlen	4,856	0	4,856	Held major league record, 1908–1930; held National League record, 1905-1930
3	Dave Bancroft*	4,623	0	4,623	
4	Honus Wagner*	4,576	0	4,576	
5	Tommy Corcoran	4,556	0	4,043	Includes 300 in American Association, 213 in Players' League; held major league record, 1905-1908
6	Luis Aparicio*	4,548	4,548	0	
7	Luke Appling*	4,398	4,398	0	Held American League record, 1948-1973
8	Ozzie Smith*	4,249	0	4,249	
9	Herman Long	4,229	142	3,752	Includes 335 in American Association; held major league record, 1898–1905; held National League record, 1899–1905; held single-season record, 1889–1890, 1891-1895
10	Bobby Wallace*	4,142	3,227	915	Held American League record, 1908-1918
11	Omar Vizquel	4,102	3,357	745	
12	Pee Wee Reese*	4,040	0	4,040	
13	Donie Bush	4,038	4,038	0	Held American League record, 1918–1948; holds the single-season record of 425 (set in 1914; tie)
14	Monte Cross	3,980	1,588	2,392	Held American League single-season record, 1902-1905
15	Roger Peckinpaugh	3,919	3,919	0	
16	Dick Bartell	3,872	307	3,565	
17	Derek Jeter*	3,820	3,820	0	
18	Joe Tinker*	3,768	0	3,481	Includes 287 in Federal League
19	Roy McMillan	3,705	0	3,705	
20	Joe Cronin*	3,696	3,693	3	
21	Dave Concepción	3,670	0	3,670	
22	Cal Ripken Jr.*	3,651	3,651	0	
23	Bert Campaneris	3,608	3,608	0	
24	George McBride	3,585	3,235	350	
25	Mickey Doolin	3,578	0	2,924	Includes 654 in Federal League
26	Dick Groat	3,505	0	3,505	
27	Garry Templeton	3,393	0	3,393	
28	Alan Trammell*	3,391	3,391	0	
29	Everett Scott	3,351	3,343	8	
30	Larry Bowa	3,314	0	3,314	
31	George Davis*	3,239	1,503	1,736	
32	Phil Rizzuto*	3,219	3,219	0	
33	Leo Cárdenas	3,218	1,198	2,020	
34	Alfredo Griffin	3,207	2,447	760	
35	Don Kessinger	3,151	260	2,891	
36	Barry Larkin*	3,150	0	3,150	
37	Billy Jurges	3,133	0	3,133	
38	Lou Boudreau*	3,132	3,132	0	
39	Leo Durocher*	3,097	243	2,854	
40	Royce Clayton	3,095	992	2,103	
41	Frankie Crosetti	3,061	3,061	0	
42	Chris Speier	3,057	14	3,043	
43	Mark Belanger	3,005	2,985	20	
44	Arky Vaughan*	2,995	0	2,995	
45	Marty Marion	2,986	105	2,881	
46	Jimmy Rollins	2,982	47	2,935	
47	Eddie Miller	2,976	0	2,976	
48	Édgar Rentería	2,963	424	2,539	
49	Wally Gerber	2,960	2,873	87	
50	Elvis Andrus	2,925	2,925	0	
51	Ed Brinkman	2,924	2,884	40	
52	Ozzie Guillén	2,911	2,764	147	
53	Miguel Tejada	2,891	2,378	513	
54	Travis Jackson*	2,878	0	2,878	
55	Art Fletcher	2,836	0	2,836	
56	Orlando Cabrera	2,823	1,301	1,522	
	Jack Glasscock	2,823	0	2,778	Includes 45 in Union Association; held major league record, 1886–1898; held National League record, 1885–1899; held NL single-season record, 1889-1890
58	Ed McKean	2,822	0	2,507	Includes 315 in American Association
59	Germany Smith	2,816	0	1,979	Includes 797 in American Association, 40 in Union Association
60	Eddie Joost	2,755	2,039	716	
61	Tony Fernández	2,708	2,132	576	
62	Freddie Patek	2,690	2,261	429	
63	Tim Foli	2,687	387	2,300	
64	Alvin Dark	2,672	0	2,672	
65	Johnny Logan	2,612	0	2,612	
66	Mike Bordick	2,606	2,535	71	
67	Joe Sewell*	2,591	2,591	0	
68	Robin Yount*	2,588	2,588	0	
69	Bones Ely	2,585	323	2,181	Includes 81 in American Association
70	Greg Gagne	2,559	2,201	358	
71	Maury Wills	2,550	0	2,550	
72	Bill Russell	2,536	0	2,536	
73	Doc Lavan	2,451	1,300	1,151	
74	Jim Fregosi	2,397	2,364	33	
75	Ivy Olson	2,389	469	1,920	
76	Bud Harrelson	2,387	118	2,269	
77	Vern Stephens	2,385	2,385	0	
78	Hughie Jennings*	2,384	1	2,202	Includes 181 in American Association; holds the single-season record of 425 (set in 1895; tie)
79	Rafael Furcal	2,373	0	2,373	
	Lyn Lary	2,373	2,303	70	
81	Billy Rogell	2,362	2,355	7	
82	Jay Bell	2,309	397	1,912	
83	Shawon Dunston	2,287	13	2,274	
84	Al Bridwell	2,267	0	2,050	Includes 217 in Federal League
85	Álex González	2,259	325	1,934	
86	Freddy Parent	2,253	2,253	0	Held American League record, 1905-1907
87	Ray Chapman	2,204	2,204	0	
88	Kid Elberfeld	2,184	2,105	79	Held American League record, 1901–1905, 1907–1908; held AL single-season record, 1901-1902
89	Brandon Crawford	2,160	0	2,160	
90	Rafael Ramírez	2,159	0	2,159	
91	Glenn Wright	2,156	0	2,156	
92	Rick Burleson	2,151	2,151	0	
93	Dick Schofield	2,140	1,932	208	
94	Chico Carrasquel	2,131	2,131	0	
95	Zoilo Versalles	2,126	1,890	236	
96	Bucky Dent	2,116	2,116	0	
97	Jhonny Peralta	2,097	1,738	359	
98	Alcides Escobar	2,095	1,717	378	
99	José Reyes	2,092	339	1,753	
100	J. J. Hardy	2,089	1,389	700	

=== Left Fielders ===
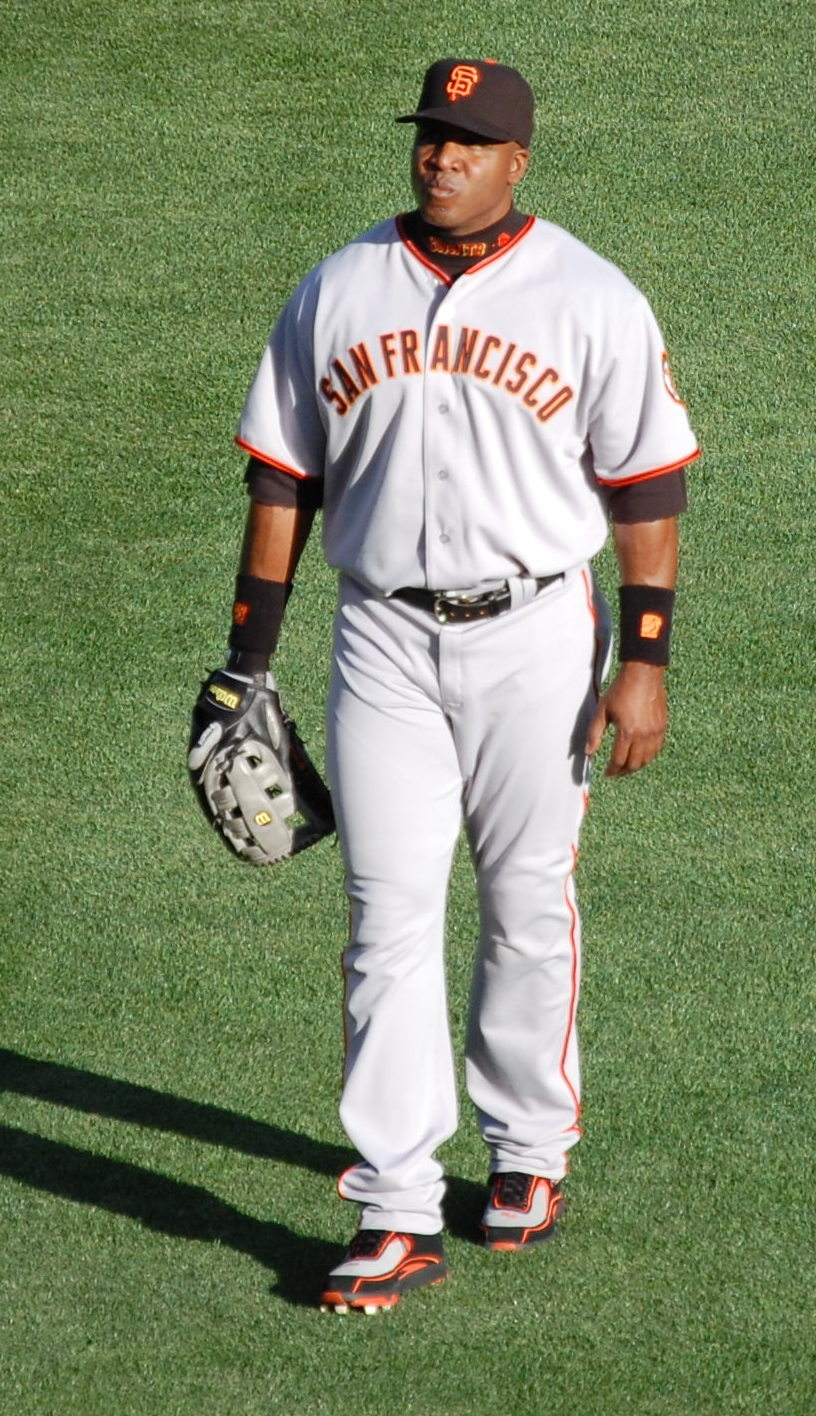
Barry Bonds, the all-time leader in putouts by a left fielder.

The left fielder (LF) is one of the three outfielders, the defensive positions in baseball farthest from the batter. Left field is the area of the outfield to the left of a person standing at home plate and facing toward the pitcher's mound. The outfielders have to try to catch long fly balls before they hit the ground or to quickly catch or retrieve and return to the infield any other balls entering the outfield. The left fielder must also be adept at navigating the area of left field where the foul line approaches the corner of the playing field and the walls of the seating areas. Being the outfielder closest to third base, the left fielder generally does not have to throw as far as the other outfielders to throw out runners advancing around the bases, so they often do not have the strongest throwing arm, but their throws need to be accurate. The left fielder normally plays behind the third baseman and shortstop, who play in or near the infield; unlike catchers and most infielders (excepting first basemen), who are virtually exclusively right-handed, left fielders can be either right- or left-handed. In the scoring system used to record defensive plays, the left fielder is assigned the number 7.

The overwhelming majority of putouts recorded by left fielders, almost to exclusivity, result from catching fly balls. However, in extraordinary circumstances, an outfielder may record a putout by receiving a throw to force out or tag out a runner while covering a base if one or more infielders are out of position to retrieve an errant throw, or by tagging a runner stranded between bases in a rundown play; however, even in such circumstances, outfielders will more typically act as a backup to infielders than cover a base themselves. Historically, putout totals for outfielders rose after 1920 with the end of the dead-ball era; the same circumstances which had kept home run totals low, such as overused baseballs and legal adulterations including the spitball, had similarly hindered the type of power hitting which lent itself to long fly balls. But as strikeout totals have risen in baseball in recent decades, the frequency of other defensive outs including flyouts has declined; as a result, putout totals for outfielders have likewise declined. Through the 2022 season, 17 of the top 20 single-season left field putout totals were recorded between 1920 and 1992; none of the top 39 have been recorded since 1997.

Because game accounts and box scores often did not distinguish between the outfield positions, there has been some difficulty in determining precise defensive statistics before 1901; because of this, and because of the similarity in their roles, defensive statistics for the three positions are frequently combined. Although efforts to distinguish between the three positions regarding games played during this period and reconstruct the separate totals have been largely successful, separate putout totals are unavailable; players whose totals are missing the figures for pre-1901 games are notated in the table below. Because they are expected to cover more territory in the outfield than their counterparts on either side, often being the fastest player of the three, center fielders typically record the highest putout totals; left fielders usually record slightly more putouts than right fielders due to the ball being more frequently hit to the left side of the field. Barry Bonds is the all-time leader in career putouts as a left fielder with 5,226. Rickey Henderson (5,215) is second all-time, and the only other player with over 5,000 career putouts as a left fielder.

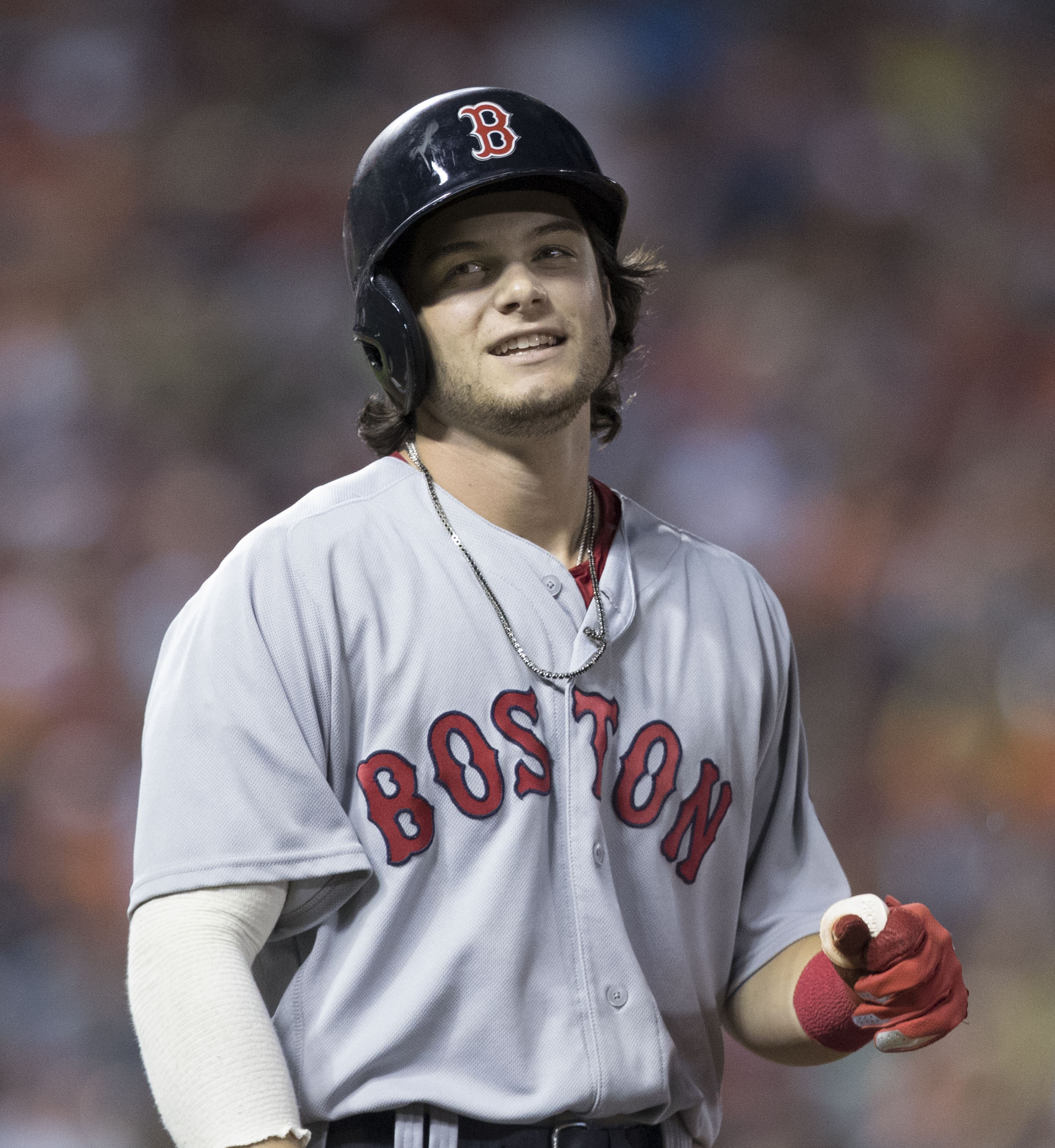
Andrew Benintendi, the active leader and tied for 83rd all-time in putouts by a left fielder.

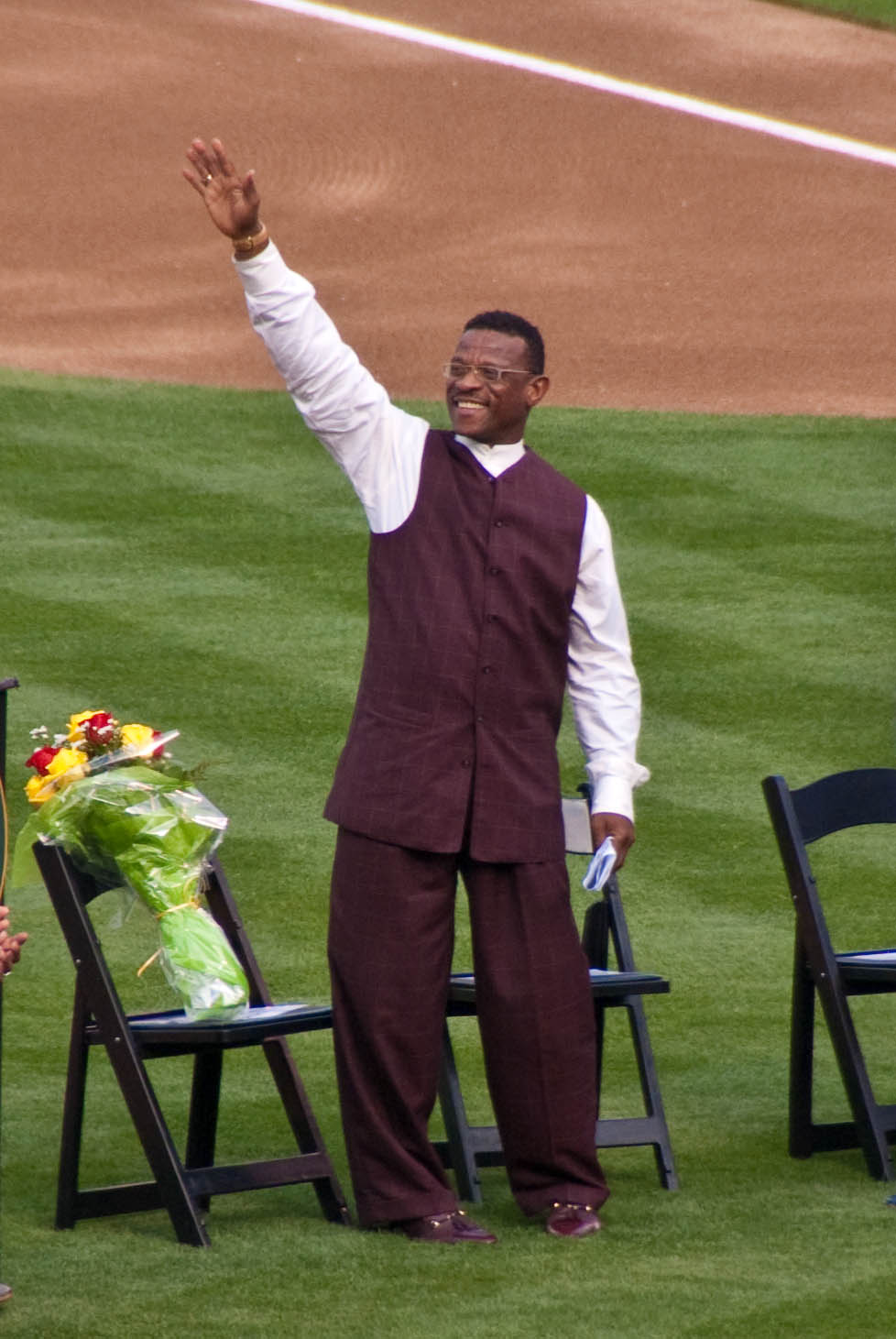
Rickey Henderson holds the American League record.

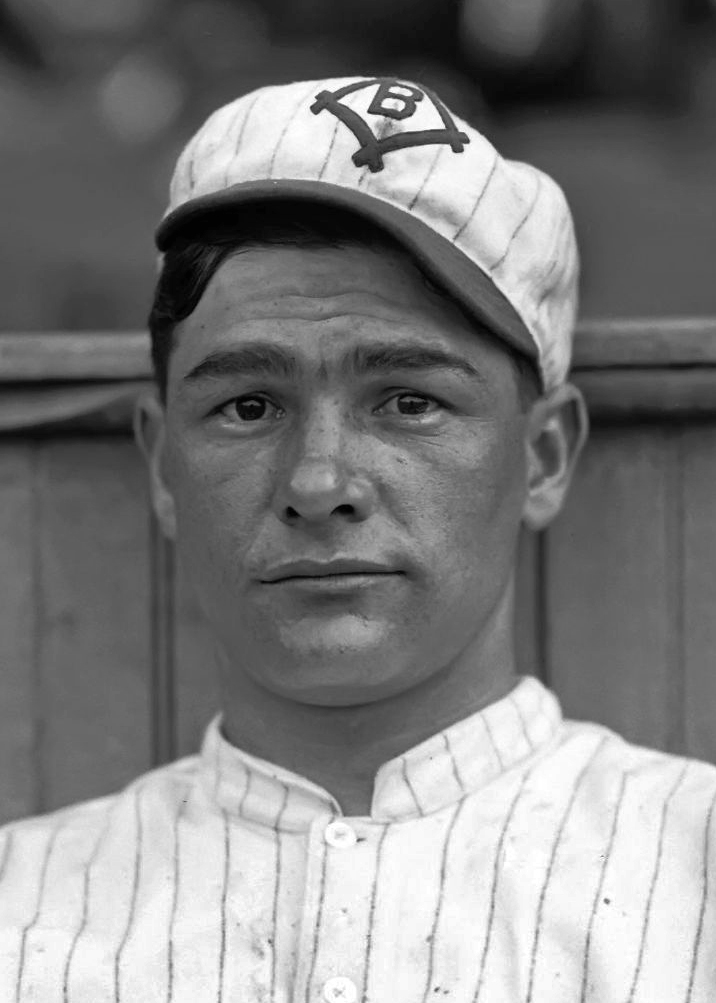
Zack Wheat held the major league record for 79 years.

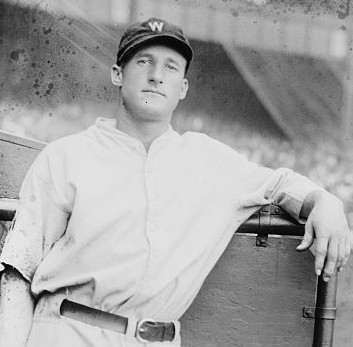
Goose Goslin held the American League record for 59 years.

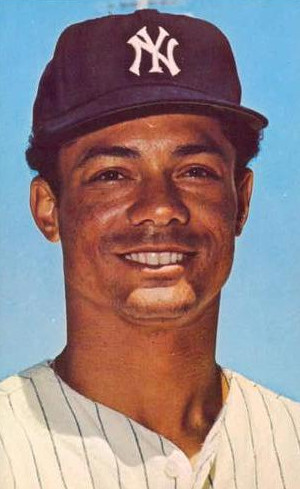
Roy White led American League left fielders in putouts a record eight times.

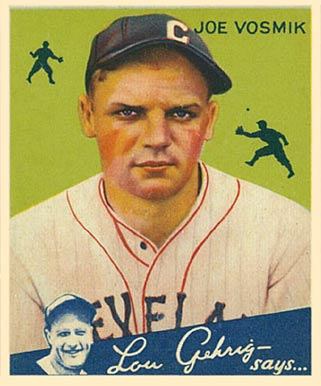
Joe Vosmik's 424 putouts in 1932 remain a major league record.

- Stats updated as of 2026 season.

Rank	Player (2027 POs)	Putouts as a left fielder			Other leagues, notes
Rank	Player (2027 POs)	MLB	American League	National League	Other leagues, notes
1	Barry Bonds	5,226	0	5,226	Holds the National League single-season record (366 in 1989)
2	Rickey Henderson*	5,215	4,526	689	Held major league record, 2000-2007
3	Zack Wheat*	4,944	107	4,837	Held modern major league record, 1921-2000; held modern National League record, 1921-2004
4	Luis Gonzalez	4,442	233	4,209	
5	Goose Goslin *	3,826	3,826	0	Held American League record, 1936-1995
6	Tim Raines*	3,769	1,472	2,297	
7	Lou Brock*	3,710	0	3,710	
8	Bobby Veach	3,624	3,624	0	Held American League record, 1921-1936; held the single-season record, 1921-1932
9	Ted Williams*	3,541	3,541	0	
10	Carl Yastrzemski*	3,521	3,521	0	
11	Joe Medwick*	3,455	0	3,455	
12	Jimmy Sheckard †	3,402	0	3,402	Held modern major league record, 1903-1921; held modern National League record, 1902-1921; held the single-season record, 1903-1904; held NL single-season record, 1903-1905
13	Sherry Magee	3,283	0	3,283	Held single-season record, 1905-1908
14	Bob Johnson	3,243	3,243	0	
15	Carl Crawford	3,182	2,819	363	
16	Roy White	3,158	3,158	0	
17	Carlos Lee	3,049	1,636	1,413	
18	Jim Rice*	3,027	3,027	0	
19	Charlie Jamieson	2,983	2,983	0	
20	George Foster	2,963	20	2,943	
21	Minnie Miñoso*	2,934	2,900	34	Negro League totals unavailable
22	Matt Holliday	2,842	189	2,653	
23	Billy Williams*	2,811	0	2,811	
24	Fred Clarke* †	2,784	0	2,784	Held single-season record, 1908-1921
25	José Cruz	2,773	4	2,769	
26	Al Simmons*	2,772	2,635	137	
27	Alex Gordon	2,699	2,699	0	
28	Garret Anderson	2,675	2,455	220	
29	Joe Vosmik	2,613	2,524	89	Holds the single-season record of 424 (set in 1932)
30	Duffy Lewis	2,577	2,577	0	Held American League record, 1916-1921
31	Ralph Kiner*	2,543	142	2,401	
32	Heinie Manush*	2,539	2,539	0	
33	Greg Vaughn	2,521	1,743	778	
34	Ken Williams	2,515	2,392	123	
35	Raúl Ibañez	2,510	1,877	633	
36	George Burns	2,506	0	2,506	
37	Del Ennis	2,481	29	2,452	
38	Gary Matthews	2,440	0	2,440	
39	Jack Graney	2,307	2,307	0	
40	Bibb Falk	2,306	2,306	0	
41	Ben Oglivie	2,296	2,296	0	
42	Gene Woodling	2,215	2,171	44	
43	Jeff Heath	2,214	1,960	254	
44	Joe Rudi	2,208	2,208	0	
45	Shannon Stewart	2,192	2,192	0	
46	Bob Bescher	2,191	0	2,191	
47	Jason Bay	2,183	443	1,740	
48	Lonnie Smith	2,173	502	1,671	
49	Ryan Braun	2,151	0	2,151	
50	Vince Coleman	2,109	344	1,765	
51	Ron Gant	2,108	53	2,055	
52	Albert Belle	2,107	2,107	0	
53	Jo-Jo Moore	2,092	0	2,092	
54	George Bell	2,080	1,831	249	
55	Gus Zernial	2,070	2,070	0	
56	Mike Greenwell	2,031	2,031	0	
57	Lou Piniella	2,025	2,025	0	
58	Pat Burrell	2,016	0	2,016	
59	Irish Meusel	1,981	1	1,980	
60	Babe Ruth*	1,978	1,955	23	
61	Topsy Hartsel †	1,976	1,710	266	Held American League record, 1907-1909
62	Carson Bigbee	1,953	0	1,953	
63	Hank Sauer	1,941	0	1,941	
64	Moisés Alou	1,938	0	1,938	
65	Augie Galan	1,918	11	1,907	
66	Kevin McReynolds	1,883	375	1,508	
67	Alfonso Soriano	1,881	120	1,761	
68	Willie Stargell*	1,863	0	1,863	
69	Dusty Baker	1,861	106	1,755	
70	Greg Luzinski	1,839	0	1,839	
71	Charlie Keller	1,834	1,834	0	
72	Justin Upton	1,819	1,139	680	
73	Cliff Floyd	1,814	31	1,783	
74	Bernard Gilkey	1,798	6	1,792	
75	Adam Dunn	1,794	18	1,776	
76	Steve Kemp	1,786	1,670	116	
77	Gary Ward	1,783	1,783	0	
78	Patsy Dougherty	1,777	1,777	0	Held American League record, 1911-1916
79	Matty McIntyre	1,749	1,749	0	Held American League record, 1909-1911; held the single-season record, 1904-1905; held AL single-season record, 1904-1916
80	Brett Gardner	1,747	1,747	0	
81	Luis Polonia	1,740	1,730	10	
82	Dale Mitchell	1,739	1,736	3	
83	**Andrew Benintendi (0)**	1,735	1,735	0	
	Willie Horton	1,735	1,735	0	
85	Geoff Jenkins	1,690	0	1,690	
86	Dan Gladden	1,662	1,646	16	
87	Larry Herndon	1,646	1,310	336	
88	Steve Henderson	1,635	349	1,286	
89	Tommy Davis	1,634	451	1,183	
90	Riggs Stephenson	1,632	0	1,632	
91	B. J. Surhoff	1,626	1,376	250	
92	Rusty Greer	1,621	1,621	0	
93	**Christian Yelich (0)**	1,607	0	1,607	
94	Manny Ramirez	1,597	1,299	298	
95	Melky Cabrera	1,590	1,295	295	
96	Charlie Maxwell	1,579	1,579	0	
97	Phil Bradley	1,575	1,281	294	
98	Stan Musial*	1,571	0	1,571	
99	Sid Gordon	1,556	0	1,556	
100	Willie Wilson	1,552	1,552	0	

=== Center Fielders ===
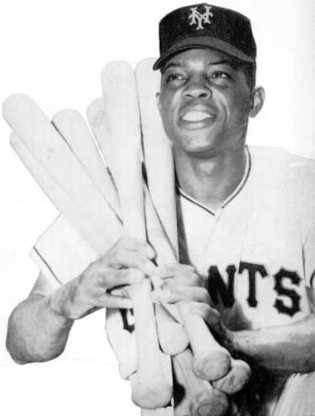
Willie Mays, the all-time leader in putouts by a center fielder.

The center fielder (CF) is one of the three outfielders, the defensive positions in baseball farthest from the batter. Center field is the area of the outfield directly in front of a person standing at home plate and facing beyond the pitcher's mound. The outfielders' duty is to try to catch long fly balls before they hit the ground or to quickly catch or retrieve and return to the infield any other balls entering the outfield. Generally having the most territory to cover, the center fielder is usually the fastest of the three outfielders, although this can also depend on the relative strength of their throwing arms and the configuration of their home field, due to the deepest part of center field being the farthest point from the infield and home plate. The center fielder normally plays behind the shortstop and second baseman, who play in or near the infield; unlike catchers and most infielders (excepting first basemen), who are virtually exclusively right-handed, center fielders can be either right- or left-handed. In the scoring system used to record defensive plays, the center fielder is assigned the number 8.

The overwhelming majority of putouts recorded by center fielders, almost to exclusivity, result from catching fly balls. However, in extraordinary circumstances, an outfielder may record a putout by receiving a throw to force out or tag out a runner while covering a base if one or more infielders are out of position to retrieve an errant throw, or by tagging a runner stranded between bases in a rundown play; however, even in such circumstances, outfielders will more typically act as a backup to infielders than cover a base themselves. Historically, putout totals for outfielders rose after 1920 with the end of the dead-ball era; the same circumstances that had kept home run totals low, such as overused baseballs and legal adulterations including the spitball, had similarly hindered the type of power hitting which lent itself to long fly balls. But as strikeout totals have risen in baseball in recent decades, the frequency of other defensive outs including flyouts has declined; as a result, putout totals for outfielders have likewise declined. Through the 2022 season, 27 of the top 30 single-season center field putout totals were recorded between 1924 and 1986; only five of the top 112 have been recorded since 2003.

Because game accounts and box scores often did not distinguish between the outfield positions, there has been some difficulty in determining precise defensive statistics before 1901; because of this, and because of the similarity in their roles, defensive statistics for the three positions are frequently combined. Although efforts to distinguish between the three positions regarding games played during this period and reconstruct the separate totals have been largely successful, separate putout totals are unavailable; players whose totals are missing the figures for pre-1901 games are notated in the table below. Because they are expected to cover more territory in the outfield than their counterparts on either side, often being the fastest player of the three, center fielders typically record the highest putout totals; six of the top seven career leaders in outfield putouts, and 14 of the top 18, were center fielders. Willie Mays is the all-time leader in putouts as a center fielder with 7,024; he is the only player to record more than 7,000 career putouts as a center fielder.

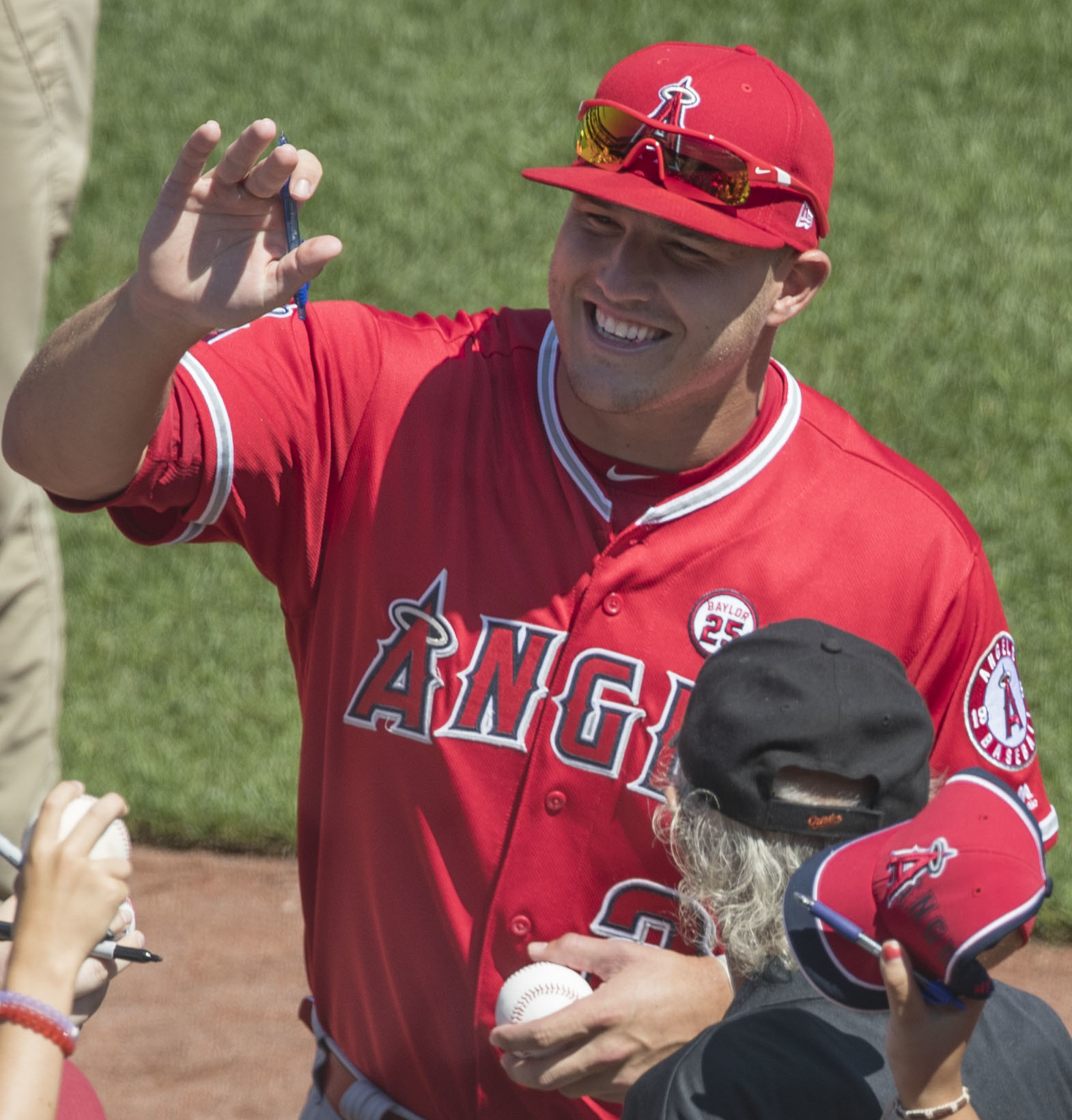
Mike Trout, the active leader and 40th all-time in putouts by a center fielder.

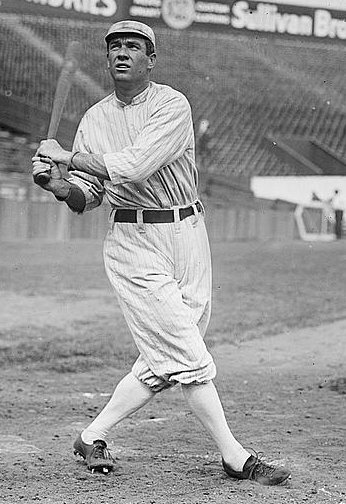
Tris Speaker holds the American League record.

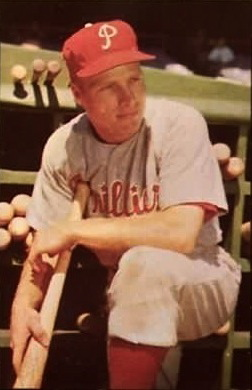
Richie Ashburn led the National League in putouts a record nine times and holds seven of the top 16 single-season totals.

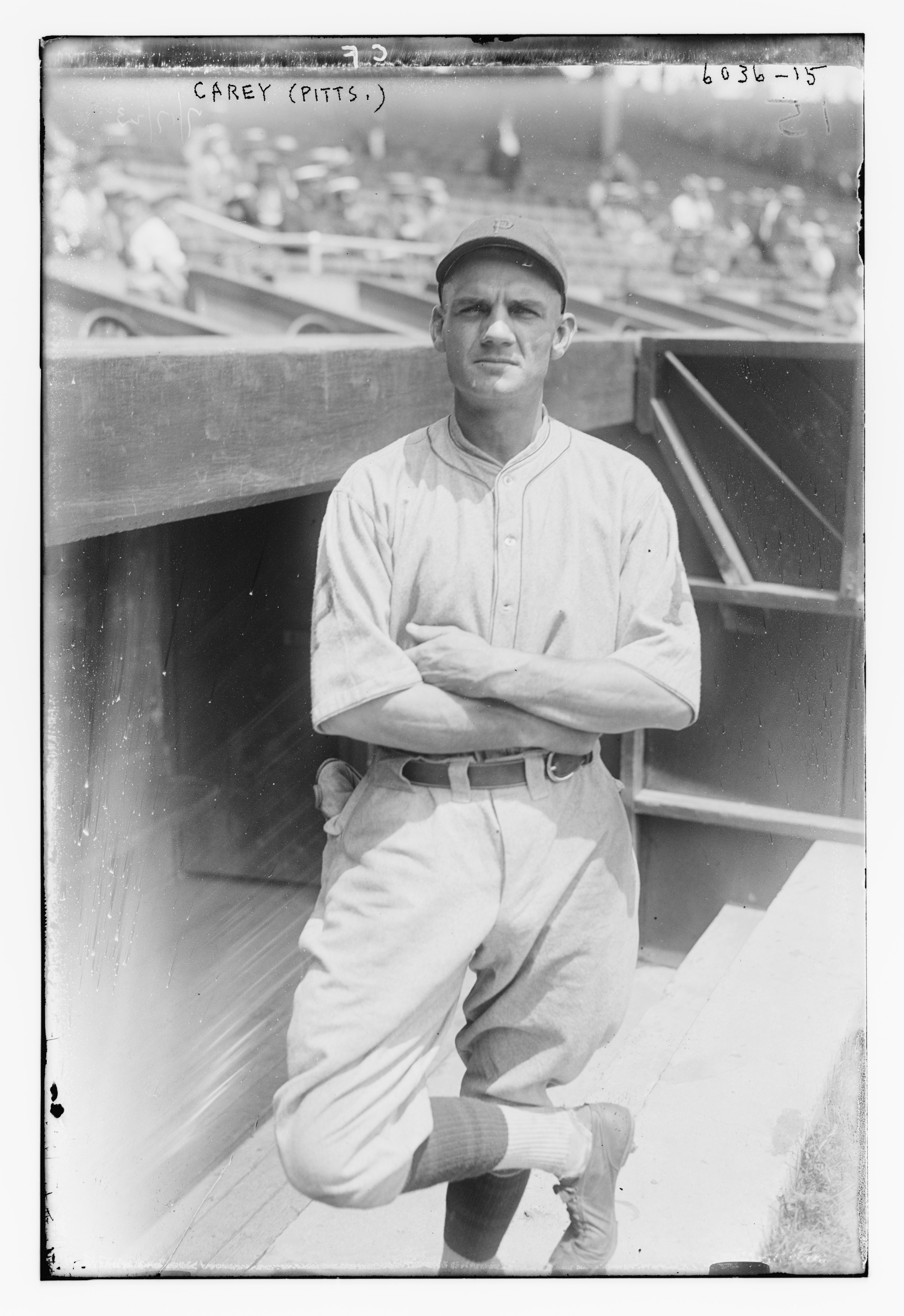
Max Carey held the National League record for 34 years.

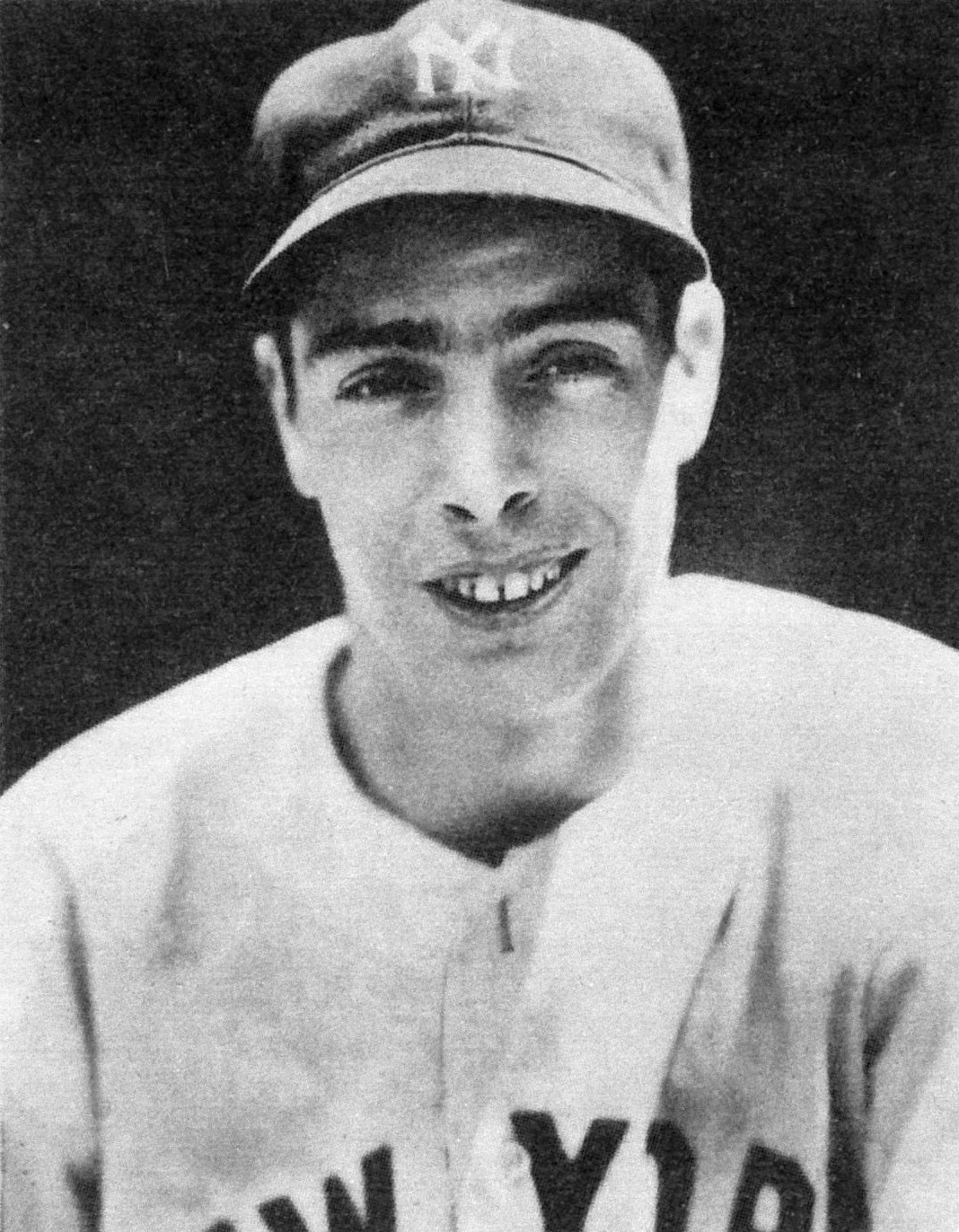
Joe DiMaggio retired with the 7th-most putouts in history despite missing three prime seasons in World War II.

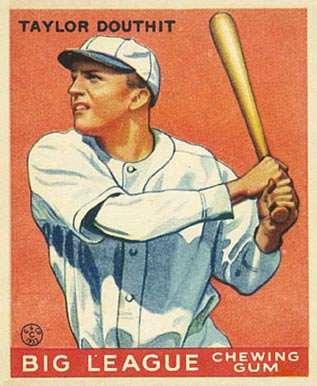
Taylor Douthit was the first center fielder to record 500 putouts in one season, and held the single-season record for 23 years.

- Stats updated as of 2026 season.

Rank	Player (2027 POs)	Putouts as a center fielder			Other leagues, notes
Rank	Player (2027 POs)	MLB	American League	National League	Other leagues, notes
1	Willie Mays*	7,037	0	7,037	
2	Tris Speaker*	6,592	6,592	0	Held modern major league record, 1915-1971; held the single-season record, 1914-1917; held the American League single-season record, 1914-1920
3	Richie Ashburn*	5,813	0	5,813	Held National League record, 1958-1967; holds the single-season record of 532 (set in 1951)
4	Steve Finley	5,348	439	4,909	
5	Willie Davis	5,279	100	5,179	
6	Ken Griffey Jr.*	5,147	3,706	1,441	
7	Brett Butler	4,947	1,704	3,243	
8	Kenny Lofton	4,758	3,554	1,204	
9	Amos Otis	4,743	4,696	47	
10	Doc Cramer	4,727	4,727	0	
11	Marquis Grissom	4,706	354	4,352	
12	Mike Cameron	4,700	2,437	2,263	
13	Max Carey*	4,590	0	4,590	Held National League record, 1924-1958; held the single-season record, 1917-1920, 1923-1924; held NL single-season record, 1917-1928
14	Bernie Williams	4,576	4,576	0	
15	Andruw Jones*	4,456	33	4,423	
16	Ty Cobb*	4,440	4,440	0	Held the modern single-season record, 1911-1914
17	Devon White	4,413	3,091	1,322	
18	Garry Maddox	4,387	0	4,387	
19	Jim Edmonds	4,341	1,522	2,819	
20	Paul Blair	4,270	4,167	103	
21	Lloyd Waner*	4,244	0	4,244	
22	Joe DiMaggio*	4,197	4,197	0	
23	Carlos Beltrán*	4,133	2,025	2,108	
24	Fred Lynn	4,093	4,080	13	
25	Chet Lemon	4,082	4,082	0	Holds the American League single-season record (509 in 1977)
26	Edd Roush*	4,071	3	3,728	Includes 340 in Federal League
27	Curt Flood	4,019	17	4,002	
28	Mickey Mantle*	4,015	4,015	0	
29	Adam Jones	3,964	3,962	2	
30	Torii Hunter	3,948	3,948	0	
31	Kirby Puckett*	3,853	3,853	0	
32	Bill Bruton	3,818	1,264	2,554	
33	Vada Pinson	3,816	368	3,448	
34	Earl Averill*	3,718	3,716	2	
35	Bill Virdon	3,649	0	3,649	
36	Duke Snider*	3,643	0	3,643	
37	César Cedeño	3,636	0	3,636	
38	Dom DiMaggio	3,557	3,557	0	
39	Rick Manning	3,533	3,533	0	
40	**Mike Trout (0)**	3,502	3,502	0	
41	Willie Wilson	3,464	3,345	119	
42	Sam West	3,456	3,456	0	
43	Dwayne Murphy	3,442	3,439	3	
44	Larry Doby*	3,422	3,396	0	Includes 26 in Negro National League (second) (incomplete)
45	Dode Paskert	3,391	0	3,391	Held modern National League record, 1917-1924
46	Lance Johnson	3,379	2,358	1,021	
47	Lloyd Moseby	3,349	3,349	0	
48	Willie McGee	3,336	137	3,199	
49	Jim Busby	3,265	3,261	4	Held the American League single-season record, 1954-1977
50	Omar Moreno	3,253	432	2,821	
51	Rick Monday	3,246	1,329	1,917	
52	Johnny Damon	3,144	3,144	0	
53	Vernon Wells	3,132	3,132	0	
54	Cy Williams	3,130	0	3,130	
55	Clyde Milan	3,124	3,124	0	
	Jimmy Piersall	3,124	3,061	63	
57	Lenny Dykstra	3,089	0	3,089	
58	Brian McRae	3,084	1,616	1,468	
59	Robin Yount*	3,056	3,056	0	
60	Curtis Granderson	2,989	2,792	197	
61	Mickey Rivers	2,967	2,967	0	
62	**Andrew McCutchen (0)**	2,959	0	2,959	
63	Gary Pettis	2,940	2,924	16	
64	Dave Henderson	2,926	2,916	10	
65	Sam Chapman	2,891	2,891	0	
66	Earle Combs*	2,850	2,850	0	
67	Andre Dawson*	2,825	0	2,825	
68	Taylor Douthit	2,821	0	2,821	Held the single-season record, 1928-1951
69	Ray Lankford	2,804	0	2,804	
70	Carlos Gómez	2,781	1,234	1,547	
71	Mike Kreevich	2,780	2,779	1	
72	Andy Van Slyke	2,762	40	2,722	
73	Coco Crisp	2,761	2,761	0	
74	Bill North	2,760	1,800	960	
75	B. J. Upton	2,758	2,061	697	
76	Otis Nixon	2,751	1,606	1,145	
77	Jim Landis	2,745	2,743	2	
78	Juan Pierre	2,740	0	2,740	
79	Aaron Rowand	2,729	1,060	1,669	
80	Terry Moore	2,700	0	2,700	
81	Michael Bourn	2,699	689	2,010	
82	Del Unser	2,684	1,306	1,378	
83	Mookie Wilson	2,682	406	2,276	
	Jimmy Wynn	2,682	0	2,682	
85	Mickey Stanley	2,666	2,666	0	
86	Denard Span	2,632	1,165	1,467	
87	Bill Tuttle	2,608	2,608	0	
88	Hy Myers	2,603	0	2,603	
89	Gorman Thomas	2,582	2,582	0	
90	Jacoby Ellsbury	2,575	2,575	0	
91	Lorenzo Cain	2,566	1,615	951	
92	Baby Doll Jacobson	2,551	2,551	0	Held the single-season record, 1924-1928; held the American League single-season record, 1924-1954
93	Ruppert Jones	2,543	1,684	859	
94	Bobby Thomson	2,531	36	2,525	
95	Roy Thomas †	2,526	0	2,526	Held modern major league record, 1905-1915; held modern National League record, 1902-1917; held the modern single-season record, 1905-1911; held modern NL single-season record, 1903-1917
96	Fred Schulte	2,511	2,391	120	
97	Vince DiMaggio	2,509	0	2,509	
98	César Gerónimo	2,505	77	2,428	
99	Kevin Kiermaier	2,438	2,375	63	
100	Austin Jackson	2,432	2,228	204	

=== Right Fielders ===
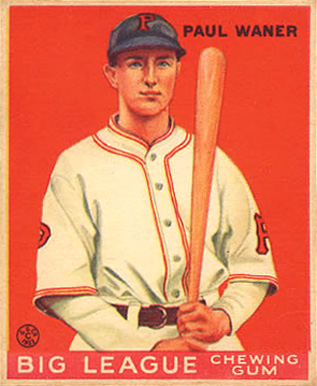
Paul Waner, the all-time leader in putouts by a right fielder.

The right fielder (RF) is one of the three outfielders, the defensive positions in baseball farthest from the batter. The right field is the area of the outfield to the right of a person standing at home plate and facing toward the pitcher's mound. The outfielders must try to catch long fly balls before they hit the ground or to quickly catch or retrieve and return to the infield any other balls entering the outfield. The right fielder must also be adept at navigating the area of the right field where the foul line approaches the corner of the playing field and the walls of the seating areas. Being the outfielder farthest from third base, the right fielder often has to make longer throws than the other outfielders to throw out runners advancing around the bases, so they often have the strongest or most accurate throwing arm. The right fielder normally plays behind the second baseman and first baseman, who play in or near the infield; unlike catchers and most infielders (excepting first basemen), who are virtually exclusively right-handed, right fielders can be either right- or left-handed. In the scoring system used to record defensive plays, the right fielder is assigned the number 9, the highest number.

The overwhelming majority of putouts recorded by right fielders, almost to exclusivity, result from catching fly balls. However, in extraordinary circumstances, an outfielder may record a putout by receiving a throw to force out or tag out a runner while covering a base if one or more infielders are out of position to retrieve an errant throw, or by tagging a runner stranded between bases in a rundown play; however, even in such circumstances, outfielders will more typically act as a backup to infielders than cover a base themselves. Historically, putout totals for outfielders rose after 1920 with the end of the dead-ball era; the same circumstances which had kept home run totals low, such as overused baseballs and legal adulterations including the spitball, had similarly hindered the type of power hitting which lent itself to long fly balls. As strikeout totals have risen in baseball in recent decades, the frequency of other defensive outs including flyouts has declined; as a result, putout totals for outfielders have generally declined, but right fielders have largely defied this trend. Eight of the top nine players, and 17 of the top 20, were active entirely after 1950. Through the 2022 season, none of the top 251 single-season right field putout totals were recorded before 1920, and only 45 were recorded before 1960; nine of the top twelve, and 40 of the top 79, have been recorded since 1996.

Because game accounts and box scores often did not distinguish between the outfield positions, there has been some difficulty in determining precise defensive statistics before 1901; because of this, and because of the similarity in their roles, defensive statistics for the three positions are frequently combined. Although efforts to distinguish between the three positions regarding games played during this period and reconstruct the separate totals have been largely successful, separate putout totals are unavailable; players whose totals are missing the figures for pre-1901 games are notated in the table below. Because they are expected to cover more territory in the outfield than their counterparts on either side, often being the fastest player of the three, center fielders typically records the highest putout totals; left fielders usually records slightly more putouts than right fielders due to the ball being more frequently hit to the left side of the field. Paul Waner is the all-time leader in career putouts by a right fielder with 4,533. Roberto Clemente (4,459), Dwight Evans (4,247), Hank Aaron (4,161), Tony Gwynn (4,052), Nick Markakis (4,025), Sammy Sosa (4,017), and Ichiro Suzuki (4,005) are the only other right fielders to record over 4,000 career putouts.

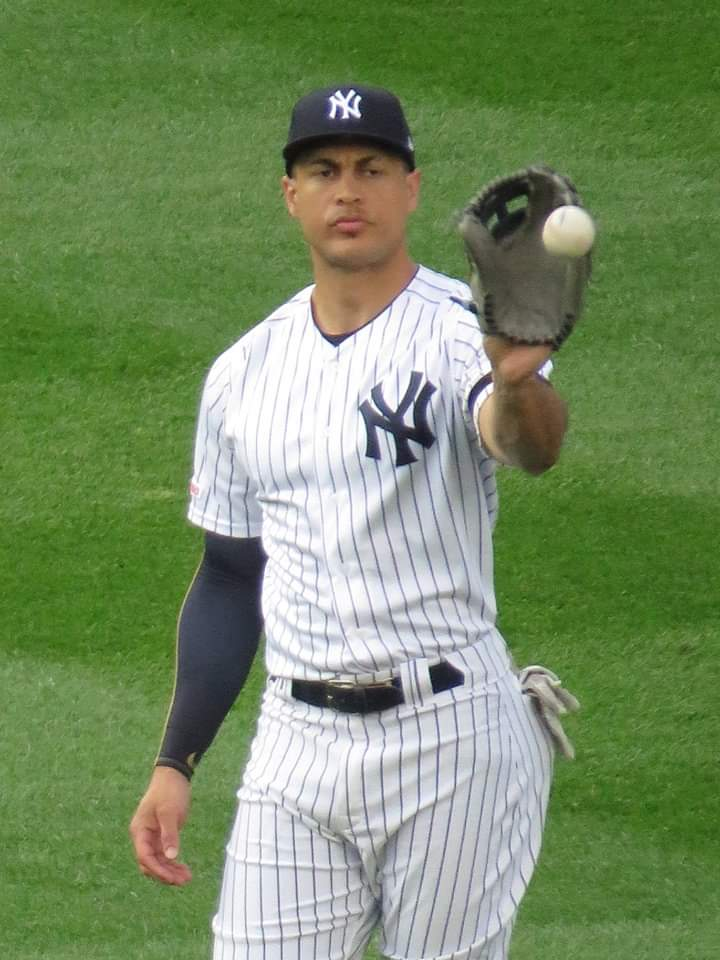
Giancarlo Stanton, the active leader in putouts by a right fielder and 57th all-time.

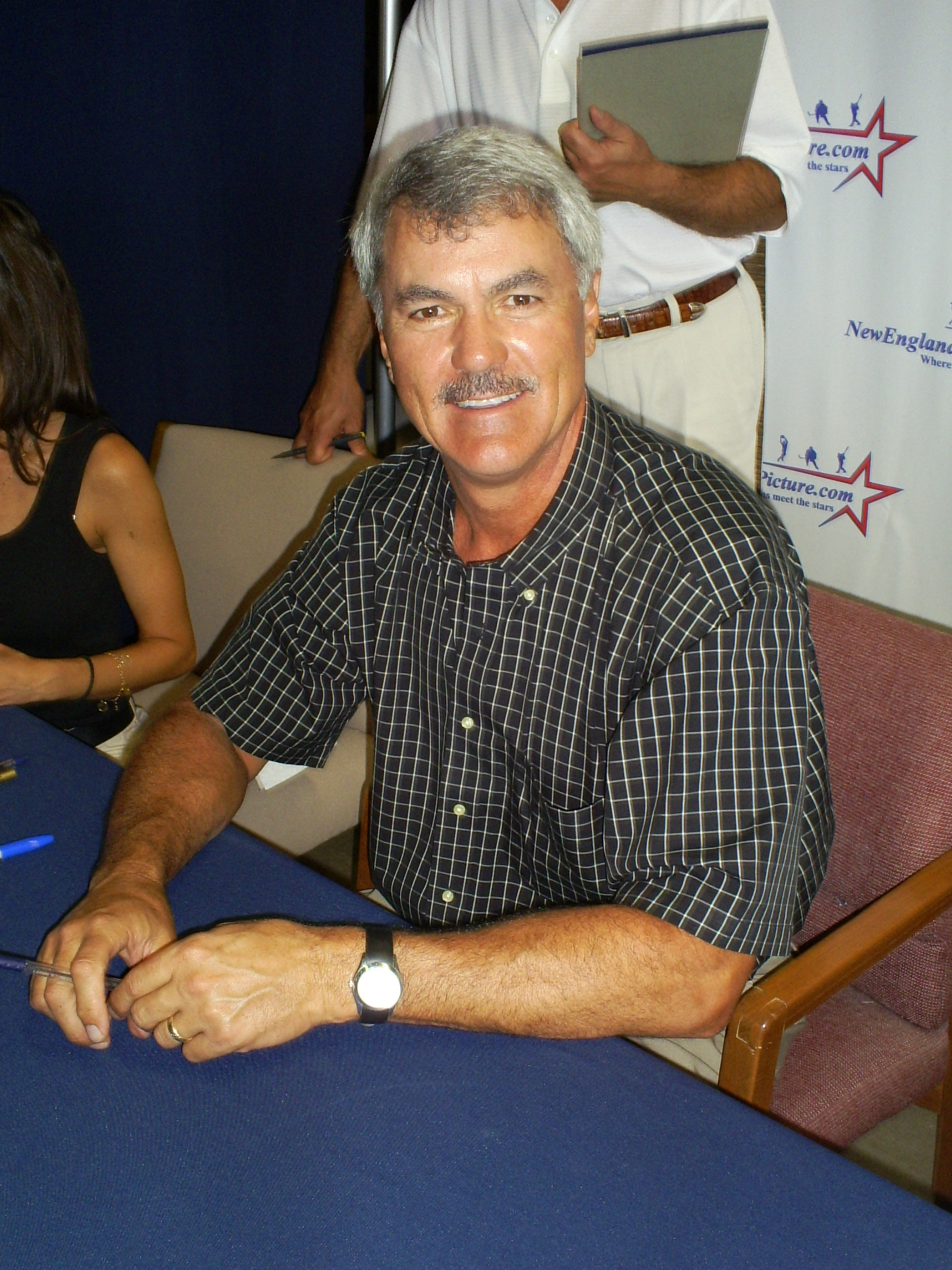
Dwight Evans holds the American League record.

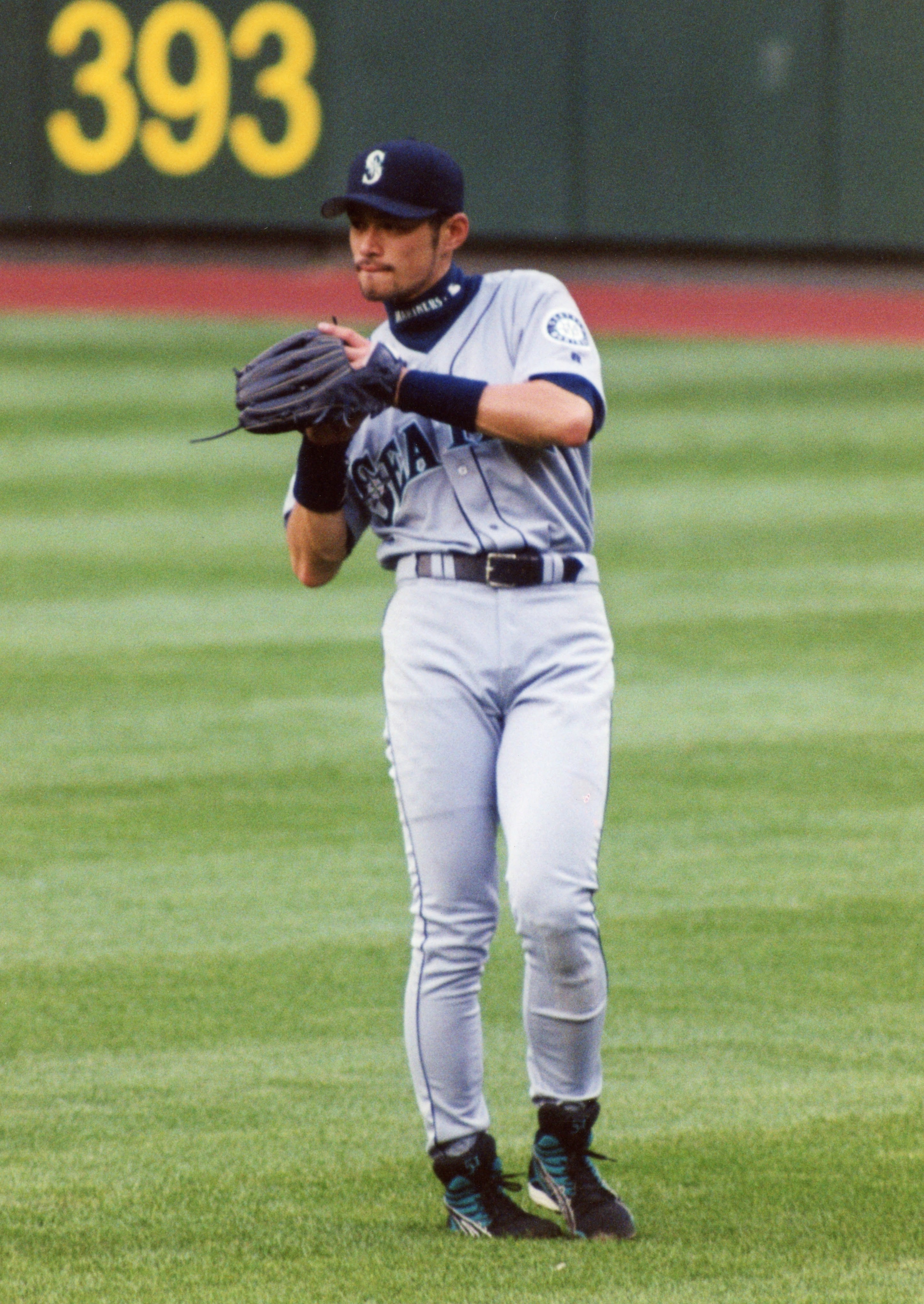
Ichiro Suzuki tied the major league record with 381 putouts in 2005.

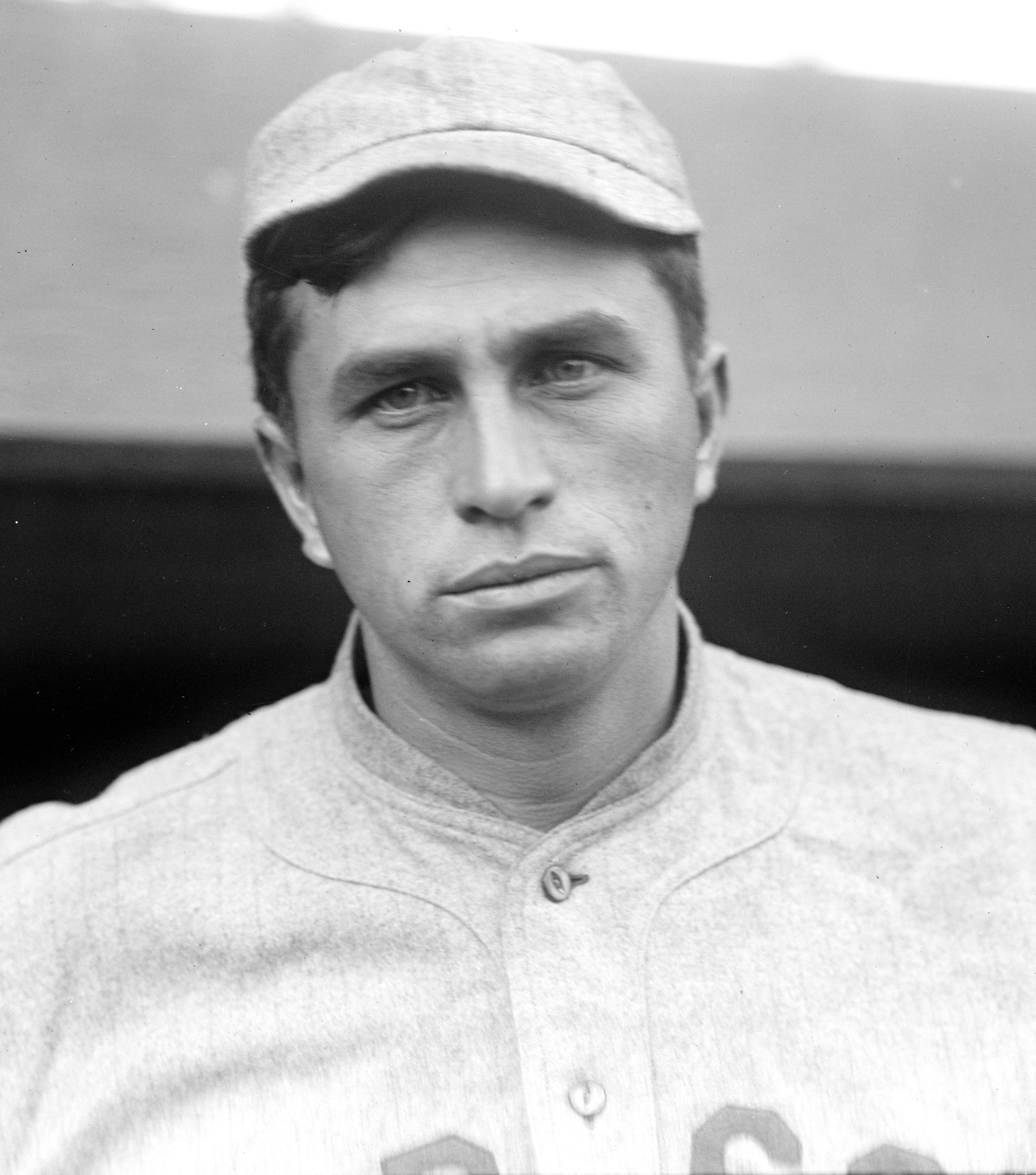
Harry Hooper held the American League record for 54 years, and led the AL in putouts a record ten times.

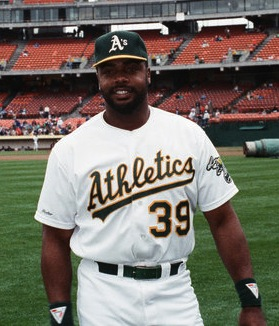
Dave Parker's 381 putouts in 1977 remain the major league record.

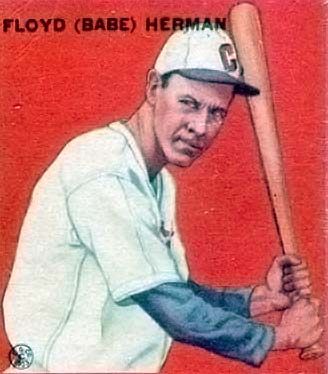
Babe Herman held the single-season record for 45 years.

- Stats updated as of 2026 season

Rank	Player (2027 POs)	Putouts as a right fielder			Other leagues, notes
Rank	Player (2027 POs)	MLB	American League	National League	Other leagues, notes
1	Paul Waner*	4,533	0	4,533	
2	Roberto Clemente*	4,459	0	4,459	
3	Dwight Evans	4,247	4,247	0	
4	Hank Aaron*	4,161	0	4,161	
5	Tony Gwynn*	4,052	0	4,052	
6	Nick Markakis	4,025	2,605	1,420	
7	Sammy Sosa	4,017	676	3,341	
8	Ichiro Suzuki*	4,005	3,743	262	Holds the single-season record of 381 (tied in 2005)
9	Al Kaline*	3,865	3,865	0	Held American League record, 1972-1988
10	Mel Ott*	3,767	0	3,767	
11	Bobby Abreu	3,733	1,126	2,607	
12	Dave Winfield*	3,657	1,892	1,765	
13	Dave Parker*	3,633	2	3,631	Holds the single-season record of 381 (set in 1977)
14	Reggie Jackson*	3,624	3,624	0	
15	Paul O'Neill	3,544	2,219	1,325	
16	Harry Hooper*	3,397	3,397	0	Held modern major league record, 1920-1938; held American League record, 1918-1972; held AL single-season record, 1915-1917 (tie), 1922-1923
17	Jermaine Dye	3,237	3,113	124	Held American League single-season record, 1999-2004
18	Vladimir Guerrero*	3,166	1,220	1,946	
19	Magglio Ordóñez	3,155	3,155	0	
20	Wally Moses	3,154	3,154	0	
21	Tom Brunansky	3,146	2,557	589	
22	Larry Walker*	3,124	0	3,124	
23	Shawn Green	3,053	1,129	1,924	
24	Johnny Callison	2,954	170	2,784	
25	Jason Heyward	2,926	19	2,907	
26	Bobby Bonds	2,918	1,191	1,727	
27	Rusty Staub	2,907	231	2,676	
28	Hunter Pence	2,889	15	2,874	
29	Jay Bruce	2,827	94	2,733	
30	Jesse Barfield	2,773	2,773	0	
31	Tim Salmon	2,700	2,700	0	Held American League single-season record, 1997-1999
32	Rubén Sierra	2,626	2,603	23	
33	Bill Nicholson	2,576	1	2,575	
34	Raúl Mondesí	2,571	879	1,692	
35	Enos Slaughter*	2,569	276	2,296	
36	Sam Rice*	2,501	2,501	0	Held American League single-season record, 1917-1922, 1923-1926
37	Jeromy Burnitz	2,473	250	2,223	
38	Carl Furillo	2,467	0	2,467	
39	Jay Buhner	2,450	2,450	0	
40	Alex Ríos	2,446	2,446	0	
41	Jeff Francoeur	2,428	684	1,744	
42	Al Cowens	2,389	2,389	0	
43	J. D. Drew	2,352	1,018	1,334	
44	Chuck Klein*	2,342	0	2,342	
45	Darryl Strawberry	2,337	30	2,307	
46	Reggie Sanders	2,310	197	2,113	
47	Rocky Colavito	2,295	2,278	17	
48	Andre Dawson*	2,280	42	2,238	
49	Sam Crawford* †	2,274	1,868	406	Held modern major league record, 1914-1920; held modern National League record, 1902-1903; held American League record, 1913-1918
50	Jackie Jensen	2,269	2,269	0	
51	Tony Oliva*	2,260	2,260	0	
52	Frank Robinson*	2,252	1,095	1,157	
53	Curt Walker	2,251	0	2,251	Held modern National League record, 1929-1933
54	Harry Heilmann*	2,246	1,975	271	
55	Ken Singleton	2,245	1,535	710	
56	José Guillén	2,213	914	1,299	
57	**Giancarlo Stanton (0)**	2,207	205	2,002	
58	Sixto Lezcano	2,137	1,447	690	
59	Kole Calhoun	2,134	1,965	169	
60	Dixie Walker	2,103	271	1,832	
61	Babe Ruth*	2,100	2,095	5	
62	**Mookie Betts (0)**	2,051	1,270	781	
63	Gary Sheffield	2,042	562	1,480	
64	Hank Bauer	2,033	2,033	0	
65	Roger Maris	2,018	1,627	391	
66	Ross Youngs*	1,996	0	1,996	
67	Harold Baines*	1,982	1,982	0	
68	Josh Reddick	1,958	1,819	139	
69	Brian Jordan	1,956	94	1,862	
70	Tommy Griffith	1.941	0	1,941	Held modern National League record, 1924-1929
71	Jack Clark	1,939	29	1,910	
72	Pete Fox	1,938	1,938	0	
73	Jayson Werth	1,921	45	1,876	
74	Bruce Campbell	1,912	1,912	0	
75	José Bautista	1,907	1,742	165	
	**Nick Castellanos (0)**	1,907	532	1,375	
77	Shin-Soo Choo	1,893	1,893	0	
78	Bing Miller	1,876	1,876	0	
79	Rob Deer	1,871	1,825	46	
80	Babe Herman	1,862	0	1,862	Held the single-season record, 1932-1977
81	Ival Goodman	1,852	0	1,852	
82	Claudell Washington	1,844	844	1,000	
	Glenn Wilson	1,844	365	1,479	
84	Chief Wilson	1,840	0	1,840	Held modern National League record, 1916-1924; held the single-season record, 1909-1920
85	Ken Griffey Sr.	1,816	227	1,589	
86	John Titus	1,795	0	1,795	Held modern major league record, 1911-1914; held modern National League record, 1909-1916
87	Elmer Valo	1,781	1,593	188	
88	Nelson Cruz	1,770	1,766	4	
89	Austin Kearns	1,766	80	1,686	
90	**Max Kepler (0)**	1,763	1,711	52	
91	Don Mueller	1,758	57	1,701	
92	Max Flack	1,734	0	1,600	Includes 134 in Federal League
93	Jack Tobin	1,727	1,378	0	Includes 349 in Federal League
94	Trot Nixon	1,723	1,714	9	
95	David Justice	1,693	196	1,497	
96	Brian Giles	1,686	45	1,641	
97	Frank Schulte	1,674	75	1,599	
98	Willard Marshall	1,671	34	1,637	
99	Reggie Smith	1,670	373	1,297	
100	Tommy Henrich	1,668	1,668	0	
