= List of San Diego Padres team records =

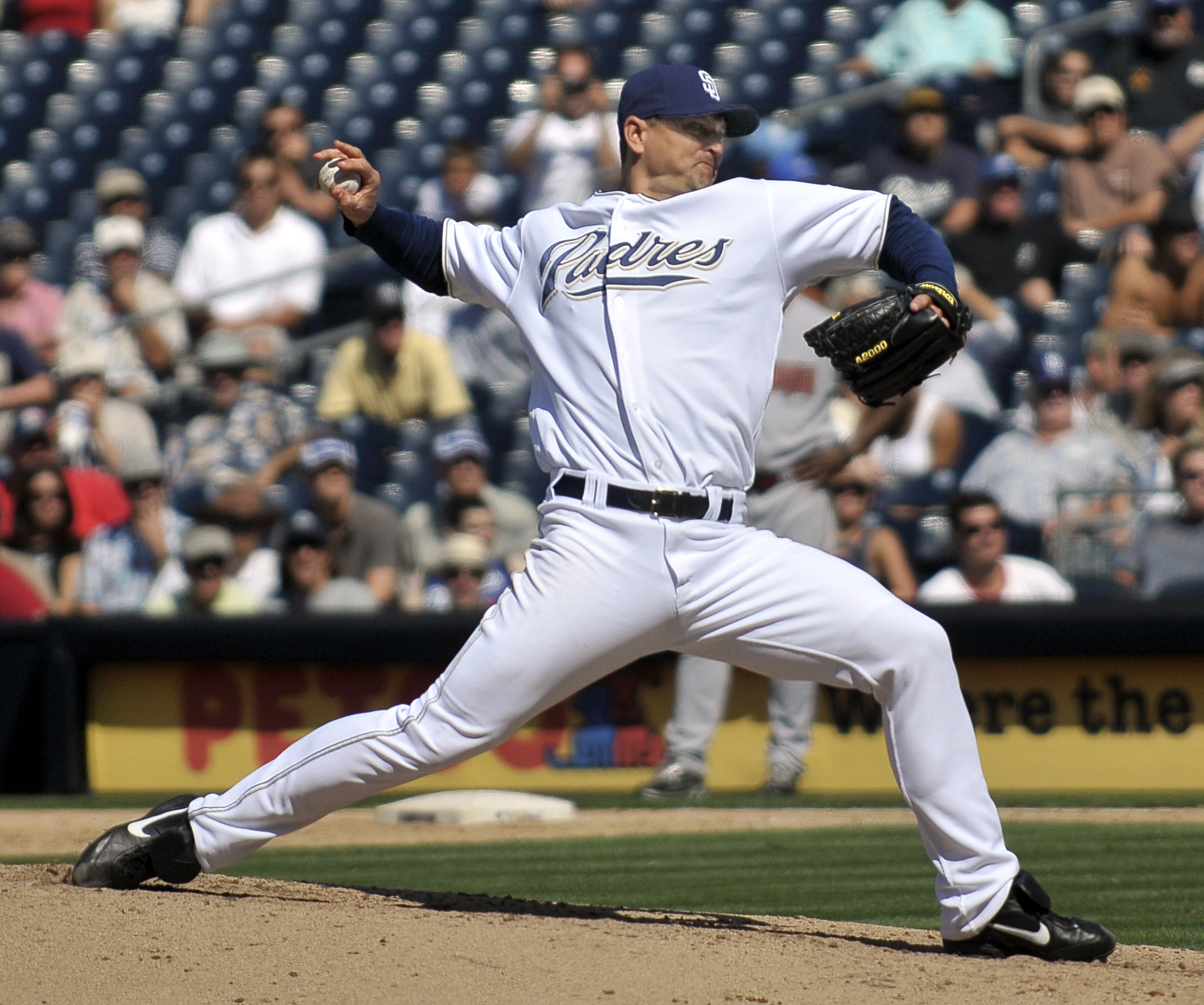
Trevor Hoffman, pictured pitching in relief for the Padres in 2008, holds four franchise records.

The San Diego Padres are an American professional baseball team based in San Diego. The Padres compete in Major League Baseball (MLB) as a member club of the National League (NL) West Division. The Padres were granted a Major League team in 1968, taking their name from the minor-league San Diego Padres of the Pacific Coast League. Through the end of the 2022 regular season, they have played 8,520 games, winning 3,952, losing 4,568, and tying two for a winning percentage of .464. This list documents the superlative records and accomplishments of team members during their tenure as members of Major League Baseball's National League.

Tony Gwynn holds the most franchise records as of the end of the 2022 season, with 15, including best single-season batting average, most career hits, and most career triples. He is followed by Randy Jones, who holds thirteen records, including most career shutouts and the single-season loss record.

Trevor Hoffman is ranked fifth in Major League Baseball for most saves in a single season, while ranking second in all-time saves, recording 601 over his 18-year career (552 as a member of the Padres). Offensively, Gwynn has the 18th highest hit total in Major League history, recording 3,141 hits over a 19-year Major League career.

== Table key ==
Table key
RBI	Run(s) batted in
ERA	Earned run average
OPS	On-base percentage plus slugging percentage
*	Tie between two or more players/teams

== Individual career records ==
Batting statistics; pitching statistics

Individual career batting records
Statistic	Player	Record	Padres career	Ref
Batting average	Tony Gwynn	.338	1982–2001	
On-base percentage	Gene Tenace	.403	1977–1980	
Slugging percentage	Ken Caminiti	.540	1995–1998	
OPS	Ken Caminiti	.924	1995–1998	
Runs	Tony Gwynn	1,383	1982–2001	
Hits	Tony Gwynn	3,141	1982–2001	
Total bases	Tony Gwynn	4,259	1982–2001	
Singles	Tony Gwynn	2,378	1982–2001	
Doubles	Tony Gwynn	543	1982–2001	
Triples	Tony Gwynn	85	1982–2001	
Home runs	Manny Machado	224	2019–	
RBI	Tony Gwynn	1,138	1982–2001	
Bases on balls	Tony Gwynn	790	1982–2001	
Strikeouts	Chase Headley	864	2007–2014, 2018	
Stolen bases	Tony Gwynn	319	1982–2001	

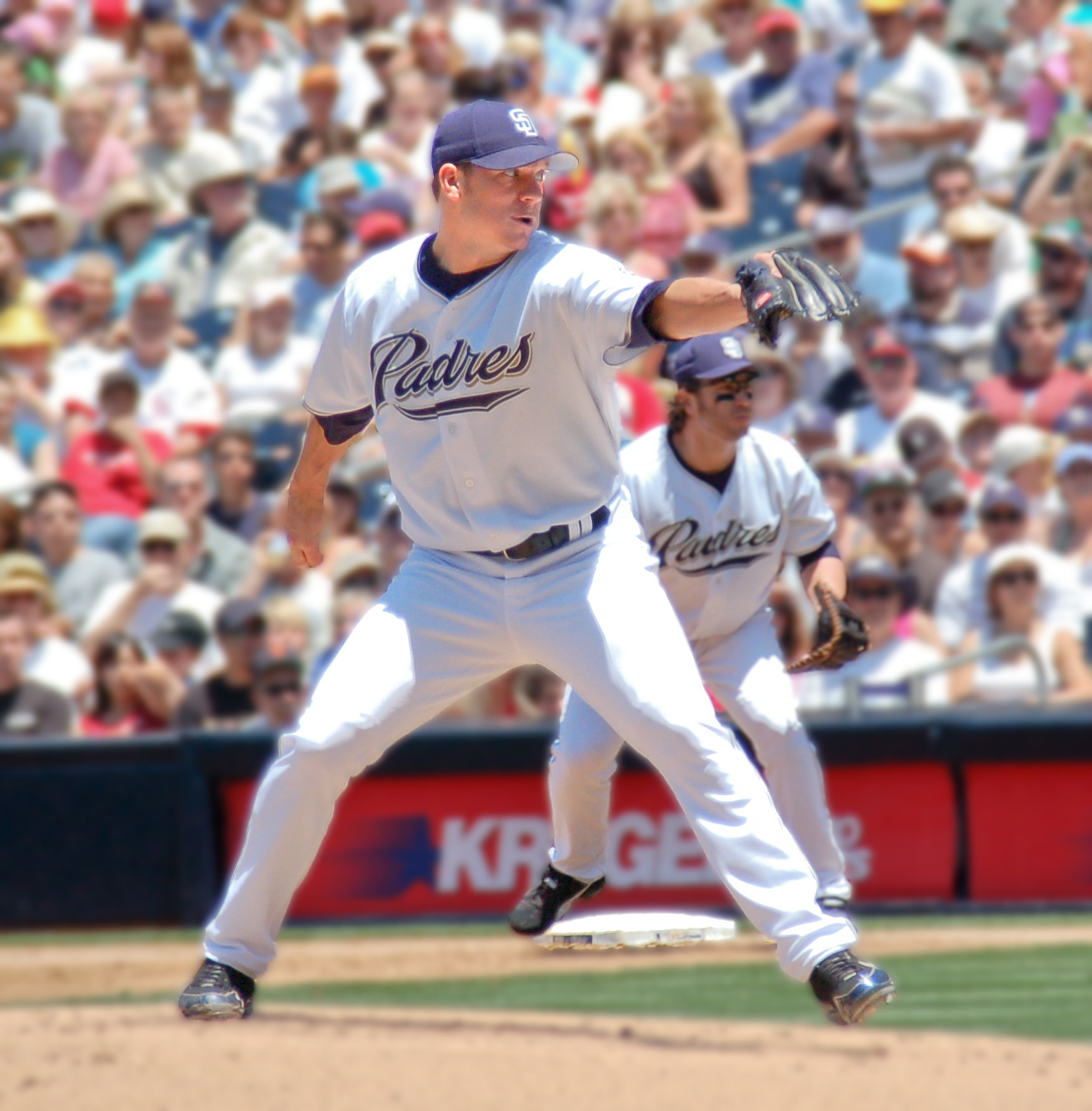
Jake Peavy, the holder of the career strikeout record for the Padres

Individual career pitching records
Statistic	Player	Record	Padres career	Ref
Wins	Eric Show	100	1981–1990	
Losses	Randy Jones	105	1973–1980	
Win–loss percentage	Gaylord Perry	.660	1978–1979	
ERA	Trevor Hoffman	2.76	1993–2008	
Saves	Trevor Hoffman	552	1993–2008	
Strikeouts	Jake Peavy	1,348	2002–2009	
Shutouts	Randy Jones	18	1973–1980	
Games	Trevor Hoffman	902	1993–2008	
Innings	Randy Jones	1,766.0	1973–1980	
Games started	Randy Jones	253	1973–1980	
Complete games	Randy Jones	71	1973–1980	
Walks	Eric Show	593	1981–1990	
Hits allowed	Randy Jones	1,720	1973–1980	
Wild pitches	Clay Kirby	48	1969–1973	
Hit batsmen	Eric Show	46*	1981–1990	
Hit batsmen	Joey Hamilton	46*	1994–1998	

== Individual single-season records ==
Batting statistics; pitching statistics

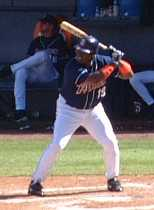
Tony Gwynn holds many Padres hitting records.

Single-season batting records
Statistic	Player	Record	Season	Ref(s)
Batting average	Tony Gwynn	.394	1994	
Home runs	Greg Vaughn	50	1998	
RBI	Ken Caminiti	130	1996	
Runs	Steve Finley	126	1996	
Hits	Tony Gwynn	220	1997	
Singles	Tony Gwynn	177	1984	
Doubles	Tony Gwynn	49	1997	
Triples	Tony Gwynn	13*	1987	
Triples	Dave Roberts	13*	2006	
Stolen bases	Alan Wiggins	70	1984	
Stolen base percentage	Everth Cabrera	91.7	2012	
At bats	Steve Finley	655	1996	
Slugging percentage	Ken Caminiti	.621	1996	
Extra-base hits	Steve Finley	84	1996	
Total bases	Steve Finley	348	1996	
On-base percentage	Tony Gwynn	.454	1994	
OPS	Ken Caminiti	1.028	1996	
Walks	Jack Clark	132	1989	
Strikeouts	Wil Myers	180	2017	

Single-season pitching records
Statistic	Player	Record	Season	Ref(s)
Wins	Randy Jones	22	1976	
Losses	Randy Jones	22	1974	
Strikeouts	Kevin Brown	257	1998	
ERA	Luis DeLeón	2.03	1982	
Earned runs allowed	Matt Clement	117	2000	
Hits allowed	Randy Jones	274	1976	
Shutouts	Fred Norman	6*	1972	
Shutouts	Randy Jones	6*	1975	
Saves	Trevor Hoffman	53	1998	
Games	Craig Lefferts	83	1986	
Starts	Randy Jones	40	1976	
Complete games	Randy Jones	25	1976	
Innings	Randy Jones	315⅓	1976	

== Individual single-game records ==
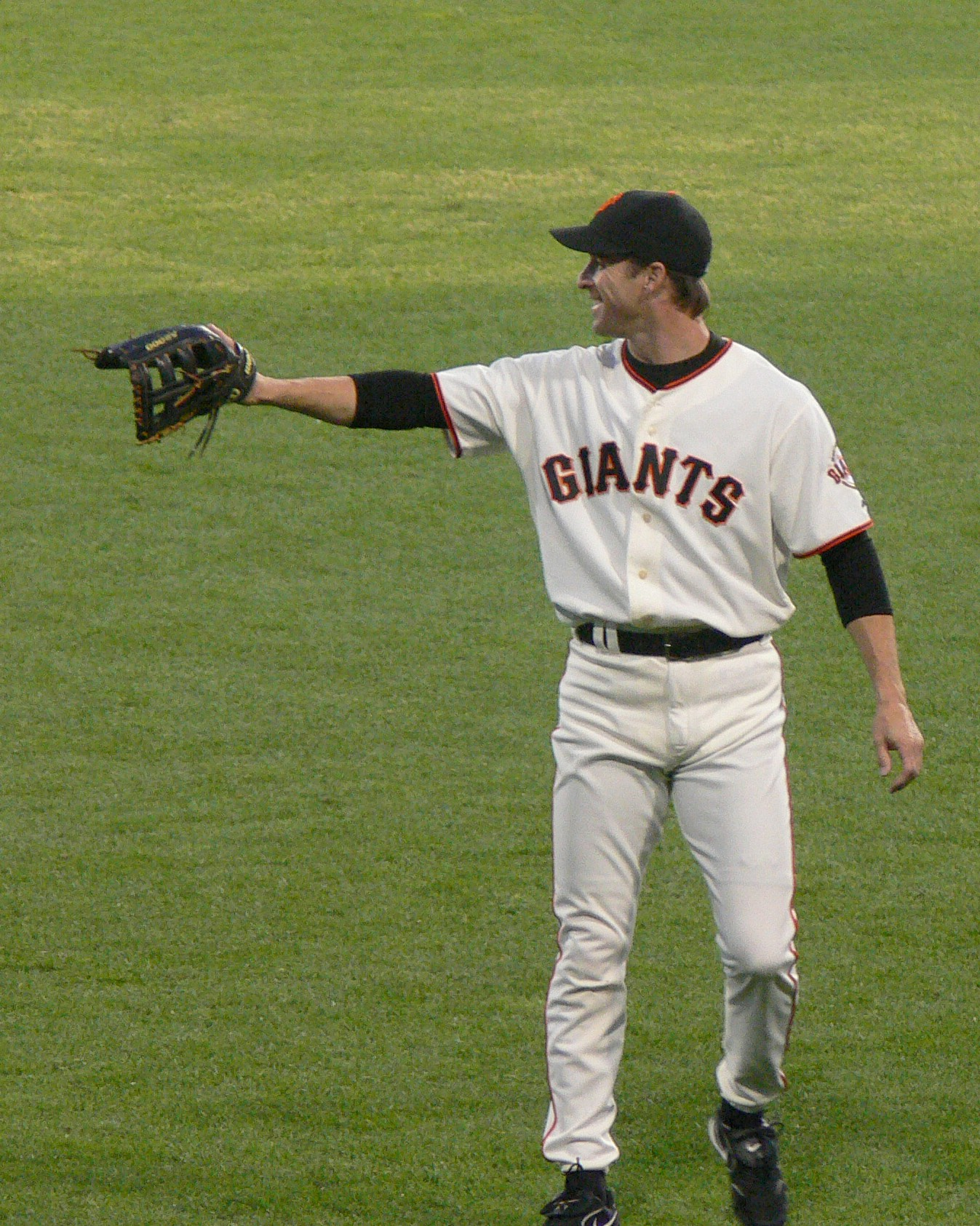
Steve Finley (pictured) is tied with Ken Caminiti for the Padre single-game total bases record

Single-game batting records
Statistic	Player	Record	Date
RBI	Nate Colbert	8*	August 1, 1972
RBI	Ken Caminiti	8*	September 19, 1995
Runs	Al Martin	5	April 15, 2000
Singles	Bill Fahey	5*	September 5, 1979
Singles	Kevin McReynolds	5*	September 5, 1984
Total bases	Steve Finley	13*	May 19, 1997
Total bases	Ken Caminiti	13*	July 12, 1998

Single-game pitching records
Statistic	Player	Record	Date
Walks allowed	Clay Kirby	10	July 15, 1969
Home runs allowed	Woody Williams	5	July 13, 2001
Innings pitched	Clay Kirby	15	September 24, 1971
Strikeouts	Jake Peavy	16	May 22, 2007

== Team season records ==
Season batting records
Statistic	Record	Season
Home runs	219	2019
Runs	795	1997
Hits	1,519	1997
Batting average	.275	1994
Walks	678	2001
At bats	5,655	1996
Most runners left on base	1,239	1980
Strikeouts	1,273	2001
Stolen bases	239	1980

Season pitching records
Statistic	Record	Season
Hits allowed	1,581	1997
Runs allowed	891	1997
Home runs allowed	219	2001
Strikeouts	1,267	2016
Saves	59	1998

== Team all-time records ==
Team all-time records
Statistic	Record
Home runs	5,069
Runs	27,161
Hits	57,577
Batting average	.252
ERA	3.94
Runs allowed	29,560

== See also ==
- Baseball statistics
- San Diego Padres award winners and league leaders
