= San Diego Padres award winners and league leaders =

This is a list of award winners and league leaders for the San Diego Padres of Major League Baseball.

== Award winners ==
=== NL Most Valuable Player ===
- 1996 – Ken Caminiti

=== NL Cy Young ===
- 1976 – Randy Jones
- 1978 – Gaylord Perry
- 1989 – Mark Davis
- 2007 – Jake Peavy
- 2023 – Blake Snell

=== NL Relief Pitcher of the Year (BBWAA) ===
- 2026 – Mason Miller

=== Trevor Hoffman NL Reliever of the Year ===
- 2026 – Mason Miller

=== NL Rookie of the Year ===
- 1976 – Butch Metzger
- 1987 – Benito Santiago

=== All-MLB Team ===
- 2019 – Kirby Yates (RP; 1st)
- 2020 – Manny Machado (3B; 1st), Fernando Tatís Jr. (SS; 1st), Dinelson Lamet (SP; 2nd)
- 2021 – Fernando Tatís Jr. (SS; 1st)
- 2022 – Manny Machado (3B; 1st)
- 2023 – Blake Snell (SP; 1st), Josh Hader (RP; 1st)
- 2024 – Manny Machado (3B; 2nd), Jackson Merrill (OF; 2nd), Dylan Cease (SP; 2nd), Michael King (SP; 2nd)
- 2026 – Fernando Tatís Jr. (OF; 1st), Mason Miller (RP, 1st)

=== NL Gold Glove Award ===
- 1979 – Dave Winfield (OF)
- 1980 – Ozzie Smith (SS), Dave Winfield (OF)
- 1981 – Ozzie Smith (SS)
- 1986 – Tony Gwynn (OF)
- 1987 – Tony Gwynn (OF)
- 1988 – Benito Santiago (C)
- 1989 – Tony Gwynn (OF), Benito Santiago (C)
- 1990 – Tony Gwynn (OF), Benito Santiago (C)
- 1991 – Tony Gwynn (OF)
- 1995 – Ken Caminiti (3B), Steve Finley (OF)
- 1996 – Ken Caminiti (3B), Steve Finley (OF)
- 1997 – Ken Caminiti (3B)
- 2006 – Mike Cameron (OF)
- 2007 – Greg Maddux (P)
- 2008 – Adrián González (1B)
- 2009 – Adrián González (1B)
- 2012 – Chase Headley (3B)
- 2020 – Trent Grisham (CF)
- 2022 – Trent Grisham (CF)
- 2023 – Ha-seong Kim (UT), Fernando Tatís Jr. (RF)
- 2025 – Fernando Tatís Jr. (RF)

=== NL Platinum Glove Award ===
- 2023 – Fernando Tatís Jr. (RF)
- 2025 – Fernando Tatís Jr. (RF)

=== Wilson Defensive Player of the Year Award ===
See explanatory note at Atlanta Braves award winners and league leaders.
Team (at all positions)

- (2012)
- (2013)

=== NL Silver Slugger Award ===
- 1983 – Terry Kennedy (C)
- 1984 – Tony Gwynn (OF), Garry Templeton (SS)
- 1986 – Tony Gwynn (OF)
- 1987 – Tony Gwynn (OF), Benito Santiago (C)
- 1988 – Benito Santiago (C)
- 1989 – Tony Gwynn (OF), Benito Santiago (C)
- 1990 – Benito Santiago (C)
- 1991 – Benito Santiago (C)
- 1992 – Fred McGriff (1B), Gary Sheffield (3B)
- 1994 – Tony Gwynn (OF)
- 1995 – Tony Gwynn (OF)
- 1996 – Ken Caminiti (3B)
- 1997 – Tony Gwynn (OF)
- 1998 – Greg Vaughn (OF)
- 2004 – Mark Loretta (2B)
- 2012 – Chase Headley (3B)
- 2020 – Manny Machado (3B), Fernando Tatís Jr. (SS)
- 2021 – Fernando Tatís Jr. (SS)
- 2023 – Juan Soto (OF)
- 2024 – Manny Machado (3B), Jackson Merrill (OF), Jurickson Profar (OF)
- 2025 – Manny Machado (3B)

=== MLB Delivery Man of the Year Award ===
- Heath Bell (2010)

=== NL Rolaids Relief Man of the Year Award ===
See footnote

- Rollie Fingers (1977, 1978, 1980)
- Mark Davis (1989)
- Trevor Hoffman (1998, 2006)
- Heath Bell (2009, 2010)

=== NL Championship Series (NLCS) MVP Award ===
- 1984 – Steve Garvey
- 1998 – Sterling Hitchcock

=== DHL Hometown Heroes (2006) ===
- Tony Gwynn — voted by MLB fans as the most outstanding player in the history of the franchise, based on on-field performance, leadership quality and character value

=== Best Major League Baseball Player ESPY Award ===
- Ken Caminiti (1997)

=== Branch Rickey Award ===
- 1995 – Tony Gwynn
- 2008 – Trevor Hoffman

=== Baseball Prospectus Internet Baseball Awards NL Manager of the Year ===
See: Baseball Prospectus#Internet Baseball Awards

- Bud Black (2010)

== Team award ==
- 1984 – National League West Division title
- 1984 – Warren C. Giles Trophy (National League champion)
- 1996 – National League West Division title
- 1998 – National League West Division title
- 1998 – Warren Giles Trophy (National League champion)
- 2005 – National League West Division title
- 2006 – National League West Division title

National League Champions
Preceded by: Florida Marlins	1998	Succeeded by: Atlanta Braves
Preceded by: Philadelphia Phillies	1984	Succeeded by: St. Louis Cardinals
National League Western Division Champions
Preceded by: Los Angeles Dodgers	2005 & 2006	Succeeded by: Arizona Diamondbacks
Preceded by: San Francisco Giants	1998	Succeeded by: Arizona Diamondbacks
Preceded by: Los Angeles Dodgers	1996	Succeeded by: San Francisco Giants
Preceded by: Los Angeles Dodgers	1984	Succeeded by: Los Angeles Dodgers

== Minor-league system ==
=== MiLB Overall Team of the Year ===
- 2009 – Fort Wayne TinCaps

== Other achievements ==
=== Hall of Famers ===
See: San Diego Padres#Baseball Hall of Famers

=== Ford C. Frick Award (broadcasters) ===
- Jerry Coleman (2005)

=== Team Hall of Fame ===
See: San Diego Padres Hall of Fame

=== Retired numbers ===
See: San Diego Padres § Retired numbers

=== California Sports Hall of Fame ===
San Diego Padres in the California Sports Hall of Fame
No.	Name	Position(s)	Seasons	Notes
6	Steve Garvey	1B	1969–1982	
19	Tony Gwynn	RF	1982–2001	Born in Los Angeles, attended San Diego State
31	Dave Winfield	RF	1973–1980	
34	Fernando Valenzuela	P	1995–1997	Elected mainly on his performance with Los Angeles Dodgers

=== Best Breakthrough Athlete ESPY Award ===
- Gary Sheffield (1993)

=== Breitbard Hall of Fame ===
See: Breitbard Hall of Fame

- Buzzie Bavasi (2007)
- Goose Gossage (2007)
- Tony Gwynn (2002)
- Randy Jones (1996)
- David Winfield (1998)

== National League statistical leaders (batting) ==
=== Batting Average ===
- 1984 – Tony Gwynn (.351)
- 1987 – Tony Gwynn (.370)
- 1988 – Tony Gwynn (.313)
- 1989 – Tony Gwynn (.336)
- 1992 – Gary Sheffield (.330)
- 1994 – Tony Gwynn (.394)
- 1995 – Tony Gwynn (.368)
- 1996 – Tony Gwynn (.353)
- 1997 – Tony Gwynn (.372)
- 2024 – Luis Arráez (.318)

=== Runs ===
- 1986 – Tony Gwynn (107) co-leader

=== RBI ===
- 1979 – Dave Winfield (118)

=== Hits ===
- 1984 – Tony Gwynn (213)
- 1986 – Tony Gwynn (211)
- 1987 – Tony Gwynn (218)
- 1989 – Tony Gwynn (203)
- 1994 – Tony Gwynn (165)
- 1995 – Tony Gwynn (197) co-leader
- 1997 – Tony Gwynn (220)
- 2025 – Luis Arráez (181)

=== On-base percentage ===
- 1994 – Tony Gwynn (.454)

=== Times on Base ===
- 1987 – Tony Gwynn (303)

=== Total Bases ===
- 1979 – Dave Winfield (333)
- 1992 – Gary Sheffield (323)

=== Home Runs ===
- 1992 – Fred McGriff (35)
- 2021 – Fernando Tatís Jr. (42)

=== Triples ===
- 1981 – Gene Richards (12) co-leader

=== Singles ===
- 1980 – Gene Richards (155)
- 1984 – Tony Gwynn (177)
- 1986 – Tony Gwynn (157) co-leader
- 1987 – Tony Gwynn (162)
- 1989 – Tony Gwynn (165)
- 1994 – Tony Gwynn (117)
- 1995 – Tony Gwynn (154)
- 1997 – Tony Gwynn (152)

=== Hit By Pitch ===
- 1977 – Gene Tenace (13)

=== Walks ===
- 1977 – Gene Tenace (125)
- 1989 – Jack Clark (132)
- 1990 – Jack Clark (104)
- 2005 – Brian Giles (119)

=== Intentional Walks ===
- 1979 – Dave Winfield (24)
- 1984 – Garry Templeton (23)
- 1985 – Garry Templeton (24) co-leader
- 1991 – Fred McGriff (26)

=== Sacrifice Hits ===
- 1970 – Pat Dobson (19)
- 1975 – Enzo Hernández (24)
- 1977 – Bill Almon (20)
- 1978 – Ozzie Smith (28)
- 1980 – Ozzie Smith (23)
- 1989 – Roberto Alomar (17)

=== Sacrifice Flies ===
- 1984 – Steve Garvey (10) co-leader
- 1984 – Carmelo Martínez (10) co-leader
- 1996 – Ken Caminiti (10) co-leader
- 1997 – Tony Gwynn (12) co-leader
- 2004 – Mark Loretta (16)

=== Grounded into Double Plays ===
- 1984 – Steve Garvey (25)
- 1991 – Benito Santiago (21)
- 1992 – Darrin Jackson (21)
- 1994 – Tony Gwynn (20)
- 2006 – Adrián González (24) co-leader

=== Outs ===
- 1981 – Ozzie Smith (381)
- 1990 – Joe Carter (513)

=== Games ===
- 1981 – Ozzie Smith (110) co-leader
- 1985 – Steve Garvey (162) co-leader
- 1990 – Joe Carter (162)

=== At Bats ===
- 1981 – Ozzie Smith (450)
- 1986 – Tony Gwynn (642)
- 1990 – Joe Carter (634)

=== At Bats per Strikeout ===
- 1984 – Tony Gwynn (26.3)
- 1989 – Tony Gwynn (20.1)
- 1990 – Tony Gwynn (24.9)
- 1991 – Tony Gwynn (27.9)
- 1992 – Tony Gwynn (32.5)
- 1994 – Tony Gwynn (22.1)
- 1995 – Tony Gwynn (35.7)
- 1996 – Tony Gwynn (26.5)
- 1997 – Tony Gwynn (21.1)
- 1998 – Tony Gwynn (25.6)

== National League statistical leaders (pitching) ==
=== ERA ===
- 1975 – Randy Jones (2.24)
- 2004 – Jake Peavy (2.27)
- 2007 – Jake Peavy (2.54)
- 2023 – Blake Snell (2.25)

=== Wins ===
- 1976 – Randy Jones (22)
- 1978 – Gaylord Perry (21)
- 2007 – Jake Peavy (19)

=== Won-Loss % ===
- 1978 – Gaylord Perry (.778)

=== Complete Games ===
- 1976 – Randy Jones (25)
- 1989 – Bruce Hurst (10) co-leader

=== Shutouts ===
- 1990 – Bruce Hurst (4) co-leader
- 1999 – Andy Ashby (3)

=== Saves ===
- 1977 – Rollie Fingers (35)
- 1978 – Rollie Fingers (37)
- 1989 – Mark Davis (44)
- 1998 – Trevor Hoffman (53)
- 2006 – Trevor Hoffman (46)
- 2025 – Robert Suárez (40)

=== Strikeouts ===
- 1994 – Andy Benes (189)
- 2005 – Jake Peavy (216)
- 2007 – Jake Peavy (240)

=== Strikeouts/9IP ===
- 1994 – Andy Benes (9.87)
- 2006 – Jake Peavy (9.56)
- 2007 – Jake Peavy (9.67)

=== Home Runs Allowed ===
- 1987 – Ed Whitson (36)
- 1990 – Dennis Rasmussen (28)
- 2001 – Kevin Jarvis (37) co-leader
- 2001 – Bobby Jones (37) co-leader

=== Hits Allowed ===
- 1976 – Randy Jones (274)
- 1992 – Andy Benes (230)

=== Hits Allowed/9IP ===
- 2006 – Chris Young (6.72)

=== WHIP (Walks plus hits per inning pitched) ===
- 1976 – Randy Jones (1.027)

=== Walks Allowed ===
- 1972 – Steve Arlin (122)
- 1998 – Joey Hamilton (106)
- 2000 – Matt Clement (125)

=== Walks/9IP ===
- 1985 – LaMarr Hoyt (.86)
- 2004 – David Wells (.92)
- 2007 – Greg Maddux (1.10)

=== Hit Batsmen ===
- 1974 – Bill Greif (14)

=== Wild Pitches ===
- 1972 – Steve Arlin (15)
- 1994 – Scott Sanders (10) co-leader
- 1999 – Sterling Hitchcock (15) co-leader
- 2000 – Matt Clement (23)

=== Innings ===
- 1976 – Randy Jones (315 1/3)

=== Games ===
- 1977 – Rollie Fingers (78)
- 1981 – Gary Lucas (57)
- 1986 – Craig Lefferts (83)

=== Games Started ===
- 1976 – Randy Jones (40)
- 1995 – Andy Ashby (31) co-leader
- 1998 – Kevin Brown (35) co-leader

=== Games Finished ===
- 1976 – Butch Metzger (62)
- 1977 – Rollie Fingers (69)
- 1989 – Mark Davis (65)

=== Losses ===
- 1969 – Clay Kirby (20)
- 1971 – Steve Arlin (19)
- 1972 – Steve Arlin (21)
- 1974 – Randy Jones (22) co-leader
- 1981 – Steve Mura (14) co-leader
- 1994 – Andy Benes (14)
- 2001 – Bobby Jones (19)

=== Batters Faced ===
- 1976 – Randy Jones (1,251)

== National League statistical leaders (age) ==
=== Oldest Player ===
- 2003 – Jesse Orosco (46)

=== Youngest Player ===
- 1971 – Jay Franklin (18)
- 1977 – Brian Greer (18)

== See also ==
- Baseball awards
- List of Major League Baseball awards
