= San Diego Hall of Fame =

San Diego Hall of Fame may refer to:

- Breitbard Hall of Fame, general sports hall of fame in San Diego, California
- Los Angeles Chargers Hall of Fame, American football hall of fame of the NFL franchise formerly in San Diego, California
- San Diego Padres Hall of Fame, baseball hall of fame of the local MLB franchise in San Diego, California
- Aztec Hall of Fame, sports hall of fame of San Diego State University
