= Randy Jones (baseball) =

American baseball player (1950–2025)

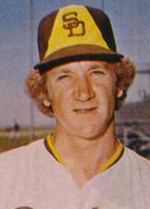
- Jones with the San Diego Padres in 1977
- Pitcher
- Born: January 12, 1950; Fullerton, California, U.S.
- Died: November 18, 2025 (aged 75); Escondido, California, U.S.
- Batted: Right Threw: Left

MLB debut
- June 16, 1973, for the San Diego Padres

Last MLB appearance
- September 7, 1982, for the New York Mets

MLB statistics
- Win–loss record: 100–123
- Earned run average: 3.42
- Strikeouts: 735
- Stats at Baseball Reference

Teams
- San Diego Padres (1973–1980); New York Mets (1981–1982)

Career highlights and awards
- 2× All-Star (1975, 1976); NL Cy Young Award (1976); MLB wins leader (1976); NL ERA leader (1975); San Diego Padres No. 35 retired; San Diego Padres Hall of Fame

Randall Leo Jones (January 12, 1950 – November 18, 2025), nicknamed "Junkman", was an American professional baseball player who was a left-handed pitcher. He was a starting pitcher in Major League Baseball (MLB), primarily with the San Diego Padres. A two-time All-Star selection, Jones won the National League (NL) Cy Young Award with San Diego in 1976 after finishing second in 1975. The Padres retired his number, 35.

In his final start in 1976, Jones damaged a nerve in his throwing arm and underwent surgery. He pitched six more seasons, spending the final two with the New York Mets, but never returned to his peak form. Jones was known for his sinker, the large number of groundball outs he induced, and his exceptional control. He was inducted into the San Diego Padres Hall of Fame in 1999, its inaugural year.

== Early life and college ==
Jones was born on January 12, 1950, in Fullerton, California. He attended Brea-Olinda High School in Brea, California, where he had an 8–2 win–loss record with a 0.91 earned run average (ERA) and 110 strikeouts as a senior. At Chapman College (now University) in Orange, California, he was the top pitcher for three years and was named an All-American as a senior.

During high school, Jones suffered tendinitis in his pitching arm. He had a fine fastball as a college freshman, but arm problems sapped his velocity. (Note: Jones said that he pulled some tendons after stumbling off the mound his freshman year, while other sources attributed the decline to recurring tendinitis in his junior year.) However, he developed the ability to set up hitters with his exceptional control, including moving pitches to different parts of the plate and altering his pitching speeds. Jones came to rely on his sinker and slider rather than his fastball.

From 1969 to 1972 at Chapman, Jones won 27 games and was named the team's most valuable player each year. In Jones's All-American senior year, Chapman recorded 38 wins and finished as the runner-up at the National Collegiate Athletic Association (NCAA) Far West Regionals. Jones set school records for strikeouts in a season with 155 in 1972, and over his college career, he set the school's career strikeout record with 311.

== Professional baseball career ==
The San Diego Padres selected Jones in the fifth round of the 1972 Major League Baseball draft. In 1972, the Padres assigned Jones to the Single-A Tri-City Padres, where he played in one game, and the Double-A Alexandria Aces where he started 11 games. He only had a 3–5 record with Alexandria, but had a 2.91 ERA and 63 strikeouts in 68 innings pitched. He began 1973 in Alexandria, where he had a 8–1 record, 2.01 ERA, three complete games, one shutout and 67 strikeouts in 67 innings.

Jones' Double-A pitching coach Warren Hacker suggested Jones work on developing his sinker, which proved successful for Jones. Over the ensuing years, he developed techniques that added to his deceptiveness in throwing velocity and durability as a pitcher. Jones' nickname as a Padre became "Junkman".

Jones made his major league debut with the Padres on June 16, 1973, pitching 1 1/3 innings as a relief pitcher. He started every other game in which he appeared that year (19), and had a 7–6 record, with a 3.16 ERA in his rookie season. In 1974, Jones went 8–22 with a 4.45 ERA. His 22 losses were tied for worst in the National League, with the Padres scoring one or fewer runs in 12 of those losses.

In 1975, Jones was 20–12 and led the National League with a 2.24 ERA, earning The Sporting News Comeback Player of the Year Award. He had 18 complete games in 36 starts, and became the first 20-game winner in Padres franchise history. Jones was second in wins and WAR (wins above replacement) (7.5) among pitchers, only behind future Baseball Hall of Fame pitcher Tom Seaver (22 wins and 7.8 WAR). The New York Mets' Seaver finished first in the Cy Young Award voting, receiving 15 first place votes to Jones's seven. Jones felt he lost out due to a lack of exposure to the influential New York media. He was selected to the 1975 NL All-Star team, and finished 10th in NL Most Valuable Player voting.

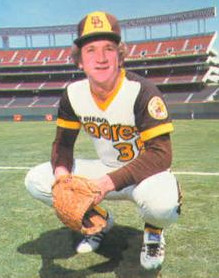
Jones in 1978

His best season was in 1976, when he survived a car crash, went 22–14 with a 2.74 ERA, and started the All-Star Game against Mark Fidrych. San Diego won just 73 games that season, with Jones being the winning pitcher in almost 30%. He became the first Padre to win the Cy Young Award, and was also the first in franchise history to receive a postseason award from the Baseball Writers' Association of America. The Sporting News named him their NL Pitcher of the Year, and selected him as the left-handed pitcher on their NL All-Star Team for the second consecutive season. From May 17 to June 22, Jones pitched 68 consecutive innings without allowing a base on balls, tying the 63-year-old NL record set by Hall of Famer Christy Mathewson in 1913. Their NL record was broken in 2001 by Hall of Fame pitcher Greg Maddux. At the All-Star break in July 1976, Jones' record was 16–3, a first-half win total that set an NL record which no one has equaled since. (Note: Vida Blue set the major league mark in 1971 with a 17–3 record at the break with the Oakland Athletics. Some sources list Wilbur Wood of the Chicago White Sox with 18 wins at the break in 1972, but the 1972 all-star game was held on July 25, when his record was only 15–10.) Sports Illustrated placed him on their cover with the headline "Threat to win 30. San Diego’s confounding Randy Jones". He finished the season as the major league leader in wins, complete games (25), games started (40), and innings pitched (315.1). In addition he was tied for second in the NL with five shutouts. Jones had only 93 strikeouts, an average of 2.7 per nine innings pitched, but walked even fewer (50), while forcing opponents into 35 double plays. As of 2025, he was the only pitcher in the past 90 years to pitch 300 innings with fewer that 100 strikeouts. His strikeout rate was even low for his era, ranking 84th out of 88 qualifying starters that season with a strikeout percentage of only 7.4%. He led the NL with a 1.027 walks plus hits per inning pitched (WHIP) even though he allowed an NL-high 274 hits.

Jones owns the distinction of recording a save for the NL in the 1975 All-Star Game and being the starting and winning pitcher the next year. During his last start of the 1976 season, he injured a nerve in his pitching arm that required surgery, and he was never quite able to regain his Cy Young form. Post-surgery in 1977, he pitched less than half the number of innings he had pitched a year earlier, and ended up with a 6–12 record and 4.58 ERA. On May 4, Jones and his Philadelphia counterpart, Jim Kaat, pitched the fastest game in Padres history at one hour and 29 minutes. San Diego won 4–1, as Jones induced 19 ground-ball outs while striking out one and walking one. He pitched effectively for San Diego in 1978 and 1979, with records of 13–14 and 11–12, 2.88 and 3.63 ERAs and 263 and 257 innings pitched, respectively in those years. In 1980, his record fell to 5–13, with a 3.91 ERA in only 154.1 innings pitched.

On December 15, 1980, Jones was traded to the Mets for José Moreno and John Pacella. After going 1–8 in 1981, he began the 1982 season at 6–2, before struggling and finishing at 7–10 with a 4.60 ERA. He pitched worse at home, surrendering 70 hits and 39 earned runs in 47 innings at Shea Stadium. The Mets released him after the season with two years remaining on his contract for $750,000. Jones signed with the Pittsburgh Pirates, but was released before the 1983 season started, thus ending his playing career.

== Coaching ==
After retiring from Major League Baseball, Jones coached young pitchers. His most prominent pupil was Barry Zito, who won the 2002 Cy Young Award with the Oakland Athletics. Another pupil, Joe Musgrove, pitched the first no-hitter in Padres history.

== Legacy ==
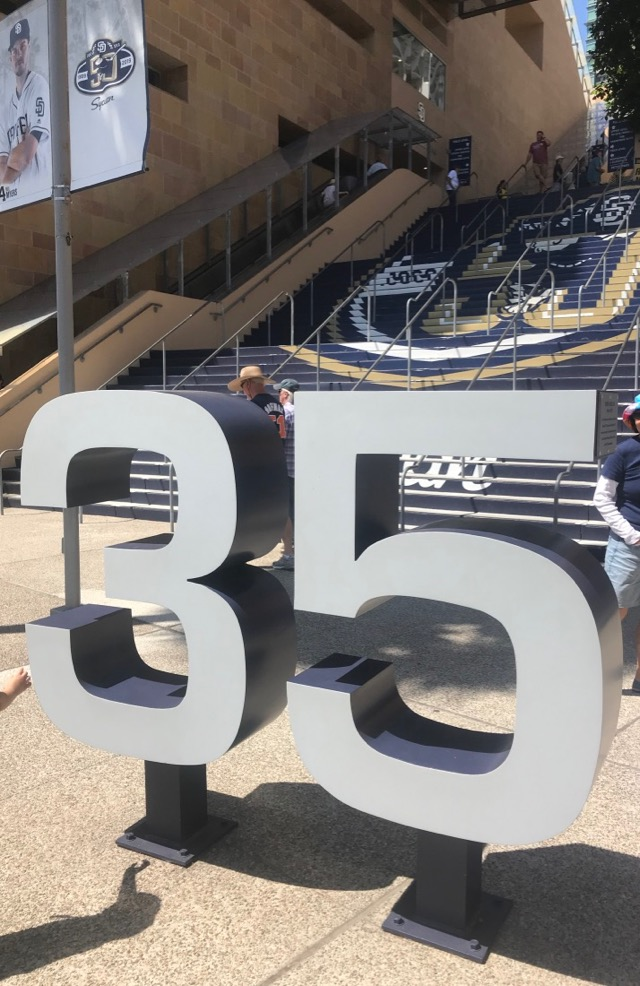
Jones's No. 35, retired by the Padres, displayed at Petco Park.

Jones finished his career with a win–loss record of 100–123 (.448) and a 3.42 ERA. He remains the only starting pitcher to win a Cy Young Award but retire with a losing record. In 285 starts, he threw 75 complete games, including 19 shutouts. He rarely walked or struck out batters. Jones's sinker, which "dropped like an anvil", was his default pitch that induced batters to hit ground balls. He was adept at forcing double plays. Pete Rose, MLB's all-time hit leader who only had a .183 lifetime batting average against him, said that Jones threw "a 27-mile-per-hour (43 km/h) fastball". Merv Rettenmund, a former teammate of Jones and Hall of Fame pitchers Jim Palmer and Nolan Ryan, stated that when Jones was at his peak there was no better pitcher he had ever seen.

One of the Padres' first homegrown stars, Jones had his uniform No. 35 retired by the team on May 9, 1997. His starts at home for San Diego spiked attendance by the thousands, and the crowd began a tradition on Opening Day in 1976 of greeting him with a pregame ovation. That year, when he won the Cy Young, the Padres drew an average of 27,400 fans in his 21 home starts, compared to 15,769 in their other home games. In its first six years of existence (1969–1974), the franchise never won more than 63 games and finished each season in last place in the six-team NL West, but then won over 70 games in Jones's two peak years, when they finished fourth in 1975 and fifth in 1976. He is credited with having put the Padres "on the map".

Jones was inducted into the Chapman Athletics Hall of Fame in 1980 and the Orange County Sports Hall of Fame in 1985. He was enshrined by the San Diego Hall of Champions into the Breitbard Hall of Fame in 1996. He was inducted as part of the inaugural class of the San Diego Padres Hall of Fame in 1999.

Jones was the subject of a malapropism by Padres broadcaster Jerry Coleman who once said, "On the mound is Randy Jones, the left-hander with the Karl Marx hairdo." Coleman had intended to say Harpo Marx.

== Personal life and death ==
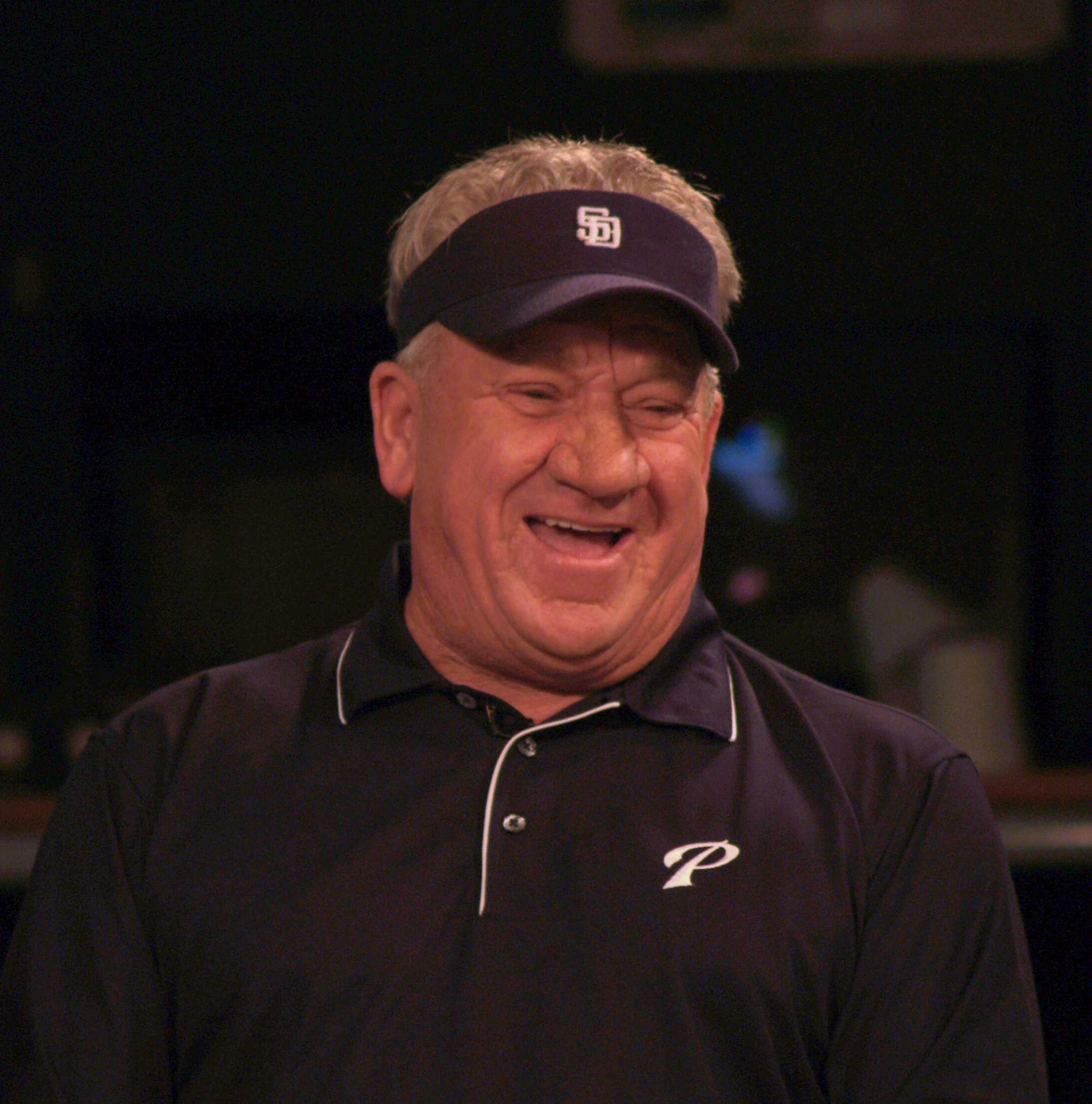
Jones in 2009

Jones married his high school sweetheart Marie (née Stassi), and they had two daughters. After retiring from playing, he ran a restaurant and catering business in San Diego, where he also operated a string of car washes. He opened the popular Randy Jones BBQ on the concourse of Qualcomm Stadium before moving it to the Padres' new home at Petco Park. In retirement, Jones became an ambassador for the Padres, often meeting and greeting with fans and at times working on pre- and post-game Padres broadcasts.

In 2016, Jones was diagnosed with throat cancer, likely caused by years of using chewing tobacco. His treatment was successful and he was declared cancer-free the following year.

His post-career projects included the Randy Jones Run/Walk that raises money for Home of Guiding Hands, an organization benefiting the developmentally disabled in the San Diego area, with which Jones worked for many years.

Jones died on November 18, 2025, at the age of 75.

== See also ==
- List of San Diego Padres team records
- San Diego Padres award winners and league leaders
