= Jake Peavy =

American baseball player (born 1981)

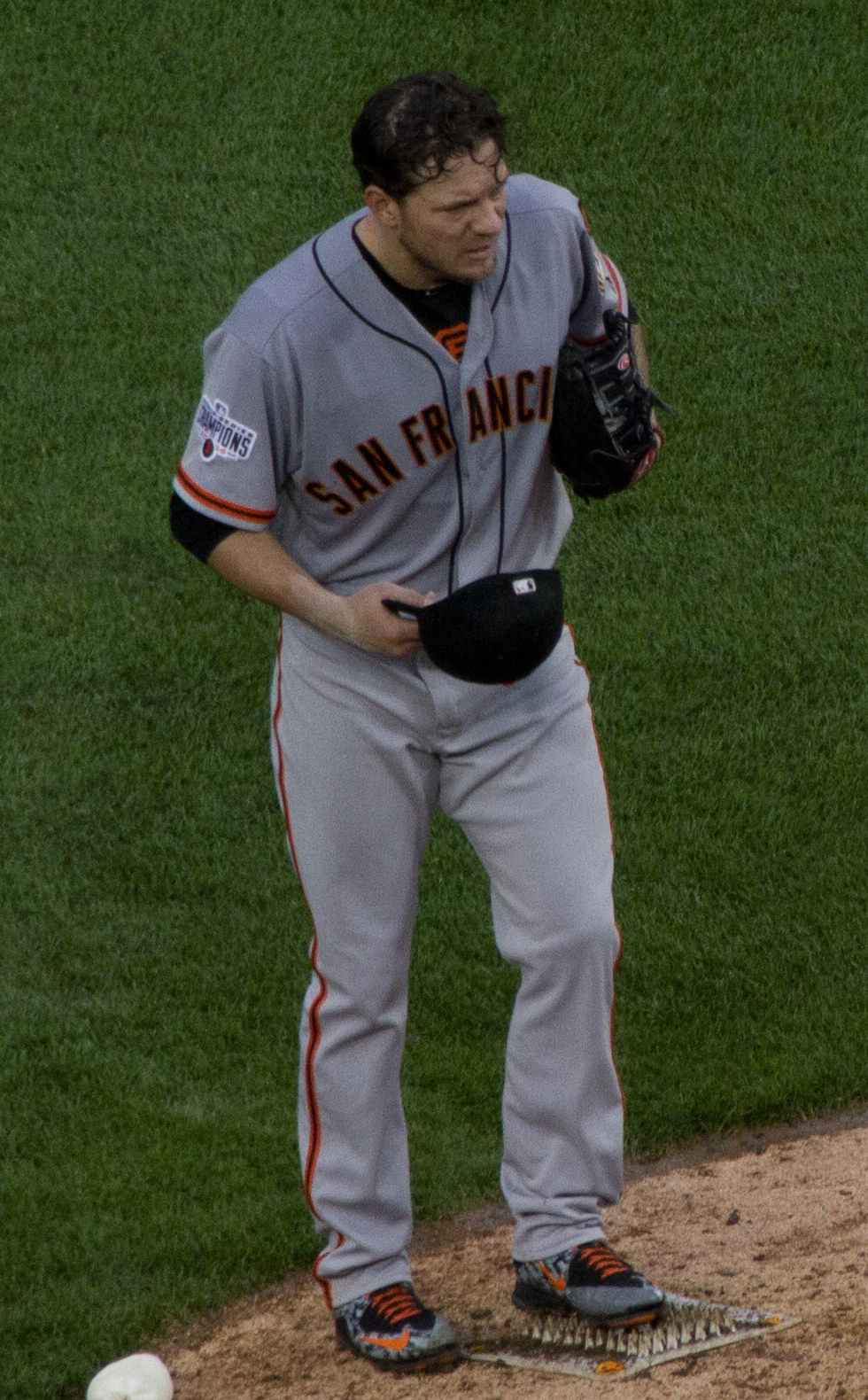
- Peavy with the Giants in 2015
- Pitcher
- Born: May 31, 1981 (age 45); Mobile, Alabama, U.S.
- Batted: Right Threw: Right

MLB debut
- June 22, 2002, for the San Diego Padres

Last MLB appearance
- September 21, 2016, for the San Francisco Giants

MLB statistics
- Win–loss record: 152–126
- Earned run average: 3.63
- Strikeouts: 2,207
- Stats at Baseball Reference

Teams
- San Diego Padres (2002–2009); Chicago White Sox (2009–2013); Boston Red Sox (2013–2014); San Francisco Giants (2014–2016)

Career highlights and awards
- 3× All-Star (2005, 2007, 2012); 2× World Series champion (2013, 2014); NL Cy Young Award (2007); Triple Crown (2007); Gold Glove Award (2012); NL wins leader (2007); 2× NL ERA leader (2004, 2007); 2× NL strikeout leader (2005, 2007); San Diego Padres Hall of Fame

Jacob Edward Peavy (born May 31, 1981) is an American former professional baseball pitcher. He is currently an on-air analyst for MLB Network and backup studio analyst for TBS MLB Tuesday.

He played in Major League Baseball (MLB) for the San Diego Padres, Chicago White Sox, Boston Red Sox, and San Francisco Giants. He batted and threw right-handed.

While with the Padres, he won the 2007 NL Cy Young Award after recording the Pitching Triple Crown that year. He was traded from the White Sox to the Red Sox in 2013, and helped them to a World Series title later that season. A year later he was traded to the San Francisco Giants, with whom he won another title that season. He is the second starting pitcher after Don Gullett to win two consecutive World Series championship titles with different teams, one in each league. He is one of ten players in Major League history to have won back-to-back World Series championships titles on different teams (Joc Pederson, Ben Zobrist, Jack Morris, Bill Skowron, Clem Labine, Don Gullett, Allie Clark, Ryan Theriot, Will Smith).

== Early life ==
Jacob Edward Peavy was born on May 31, 1981, in Mobile, Alabama.

== Professional career ==
=== Draft and minor leagues ===
Peavy was drafted by the San Diego Padres in the 15th round (472nd overall) of the 1999 MLB draft out of high school (St. Paul's Episcopal School). He was named the high school player of the year in the state of Alabama. Peavy declined an offer to pitch for Auburn University in order to accept the Padres' contract offer.

Peavy pitched for the Arizona League Padres and the Idaho Falls Braves in 1999 and the Fort Wayne Wizards in 2000. In 2001, Peavy played with the Lake Elsinore Storm and the Mobile BayBears. He split the 2002 season between the BayBears and the San Diego Padres.

=== San Diego Padres (2002–2009) ===
==== 2002–2006 ====
Peavy was called up from Double-A to make his major league debut on June 22, 2002, against the New York Yankees at Qualcomm Stadium. He lost the game, allowing one run on three hits in six innings while striking out four. In total, Peavy had six wins and seven losses with a 4.52 earned run average (ERA) and 90 strikeouts. The Padres won just 66 games and were in the cellar of the NL West. In his sophomore season, Peavy started 32 games (194.2 IP), with a 4.11 earned run average, a 12–11 record, and 156 strikeouts. The Padres finished last in their division again at a 64–98 record.

During his third year of major league experience in 2004, Peavy emerged as the Padres' ace starting pitcher and one of the best pitchers in baseball. He compiled a 15–6 record, struck out 173 in 166 innings, and led Major League Baseball with a 2.27 ERA. He became the youngest pitcher to win an ERA title since Dwight Gooden in 1985. On September 17, 2004, Peavy allowed Barry Bonds' 700th career home run. Additionally Peavy would later end up being the final pitcher Bonds ever faced in his career, on September 26th, 2007.

On March 5, 2005, he signed a four-year, $14.5 million contract and held a club option for 2009 extension with the Padres.

During the 2005 season, Peavy was selected for the National League All-Star team and ended the regular season leading the National League in strikeouts with 216 (in 203 innings). He was second in the majors to Minnesota's Johan Santana who had 238 strikeouts. In addition, he finished the season with a 13–7 record, 2.88 ERA, a strikeout-to-walk ratio of over 4:1 and WHIP of 1.044.

After the Padres won the National League West in 2005, Peavy missed the rest of the season with a broken rib, which he apparently suffered while celebrating.

Peavy was the captain of Team USA in the 2006 World Baseball Classic, held in San Diego. He started the opening game for the U.S., a 2–0 win over Mexico, giving up just one hit and no runs over three innings. He did not factor in the decision in the second-round game against Japan, as he gave up three runs in five innings in a game that the U.S. won, 4–3.

In 2006, Peavy got off to a rocky start, in part due to mechanical adjustments brought on by various off-season injuries. Although Peavy would go only 11–14 with a 4.09 ERA, he still managed to finish second in the National League in strikeouts with 215, one shy of both his 2005 league-leading total and of the 2006 NL strikeout leader, Aaron Harang, who logged 32 more innings than Peavy. In the playoffs, the Padres again faced the St. Louis Cardinals in the first round. As the game one starter, Peavy had a much stronger outing than his 2005 playoff game, but the Padres again lost to the Cardinals.

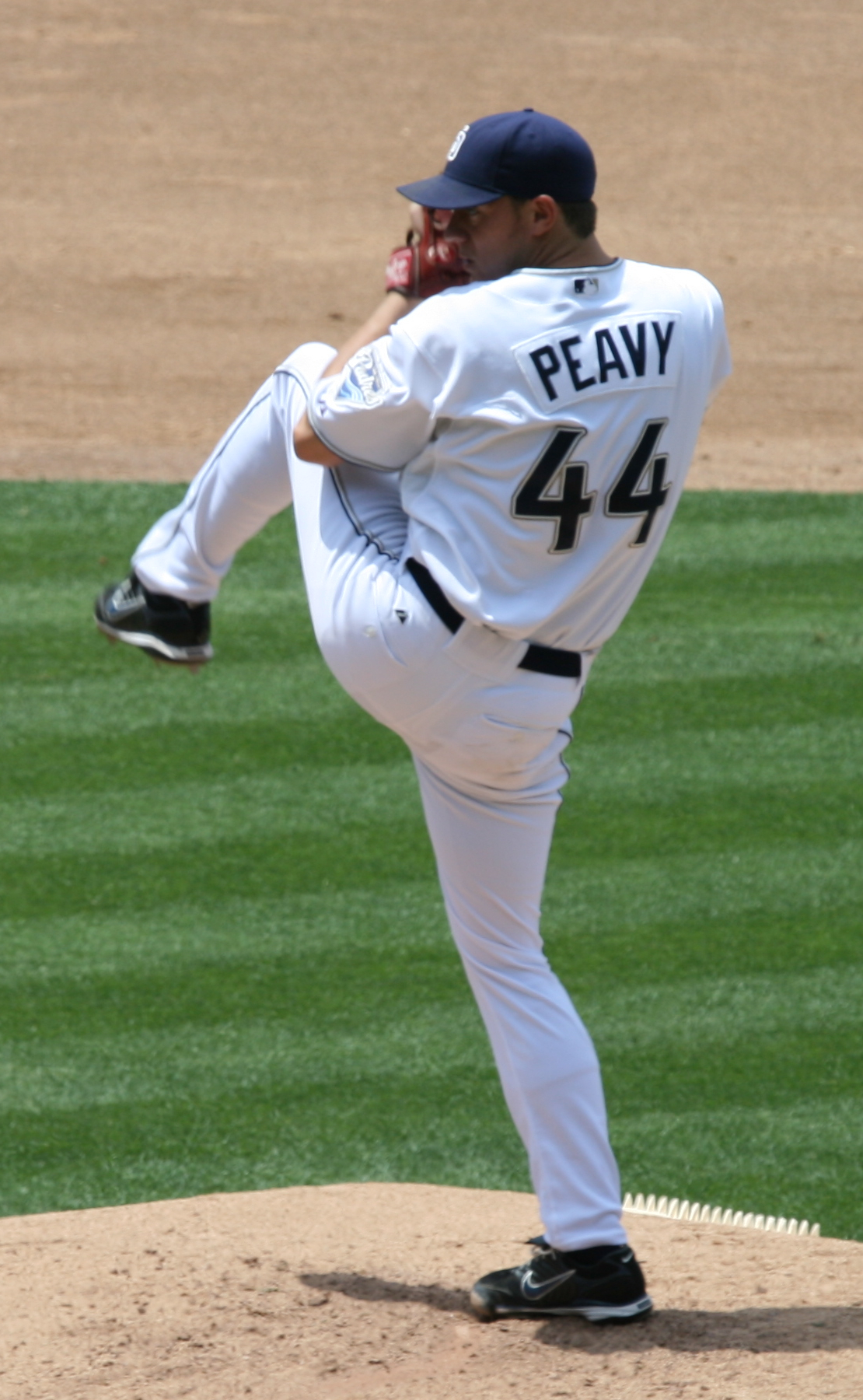
Peavy pitching for the San Diego Padres in 2007

==== 2007–2009 ====
On July 1, 2007, for the second time in his career, Peavy was named to the 2007 NL All-Star Team. On July 9, he was named as the starting pitcher for the NL. On August 2, Peavy struck out Arizona Diamondbacks outfielder Jeff DaVanon, for his 1000th career strikeout.

Peavy won the pitching Triple Crown in 2007, leading the National League with 19 wins, 240 strikeouts, and a 2.54 ERA. Since the divisional play era started in 1969, Peavy is only the eighth player to accomplish this feat. On October 23, Peavy won the Players Choice Award for Outstanding NL Pitcher. He added the NL Cy Young award—as a unanimous choice—on November 15, becoming just the 10th National League player in history to win the Cy Young Award in a unanimous vote (Sandy Koufax was unanimously selected three times).

The completion of the 2007 campaign represented Peavy's sixth year in the league. Over that six-year period Peavy collected two strikeout champion awards, two major league ERA titles, and a unanimous, triple-crown Cy Young Award.

On December 12, 2007, he signed a 4-year extension, worth $52 million with the Padres. At the time the contract was the largest in Padres history. The contract included a $22 million option for 2013.

On April 5, 2008, Peavy pitched a two-hit complete game over the Los Angeles Dodgers. The following day, still-images from FOX sports video feed from the game showed a dirty, brown substance on the index and middle fingers, along with his thumb. Manager Bud Black defended Peavy saying that "it was a mixture of dirt and rosin". In the two games immediately following the report, Peavy posted a 1–0 record with a 1.92 ERA. In May, he went on the DL with a sore throwing elbow. He returned on June 12 and pitched six shutout innings with four strikeouts. He ended 2008 with only a 10–11 record, but had one of the lowest run support per start of any pitcher in the league, and finished the season with a 2.85 ERA.

Peavy had been the subject of numerous trade rumors during the 2008 offseason, amidst reports that the Padres were looking to reduce salaries and build on young players for the future. In November 2008, Peavy added the New York Yankees to the list of teams he would accept a trade to. The list included several teams from the NL including the Atlanta Braves, St. Louis Cardinals, the Chicago Cubs, the Los Angeles Dodgers, and the Houston Astros. Peavy preferred to be in the NL, so the Yankees would not be involved. The Astros and Cardinals decided they would not pursue Peavy after talking with GM Kevin Towers on what they would have to give up.

In November 2008, the Padres were working with the Braves on a Peavy trade, in which Peavy would be traded to Atlanta for SS Yunel Escobar, OF Gorkys Hernández, P Blaine Boyer and one of P Charlie Morton or P Jo-Jo Reyes. The Padres wanted the two top prospects in the organization as well, pitcher Tommy Hanson and outfielder Jordan Schafer, but after a few weeks, the Braves decided to move on to bring in a few free agents.

In spring training, Peavy pitched 14 total innings with no runs allowed, 10 strikeouts and no walks. He rejected a trade to the Chicago White Sox, which included Aaron Poreda and Clayton Richard, saying that remaining in San Diego was best for him and his family. On May 22, Peavy hurt his ankle rounding third base against the Chicago Cubs in a start where he earned the win with 6 scoreless innings and 10 strikeouts a day after rejecting a trade to the White Sox. On June 12, Peavy learned he had a strained tendon in the back of his ankle, suffered in the May 22 start. He was placed on the DL the same day. At the time of his injury, Peavy was 6–6 with 3.96 ERA and 92 strikeouts.

=== Chicago White Sox (2009–2013) ===
On July 31, Peavy agreed to a trade to the Chicago White Sox in a last-minute trade deadline day deal for Clayton Richard, Aaron Poreda, Adam Russell and Dexter Carter.

In his first start for the White Sox, Peavy pitched 5 innings, giving up 3 runs (all earned), and striking out 5, getting the win against the Kansas City Royals. Peavy went 3–0 in his time with the White Sox compiling his year's record to 9–6. In his 2009 stint with the White Sox he shut out the Detroit Tigers on two occasions.

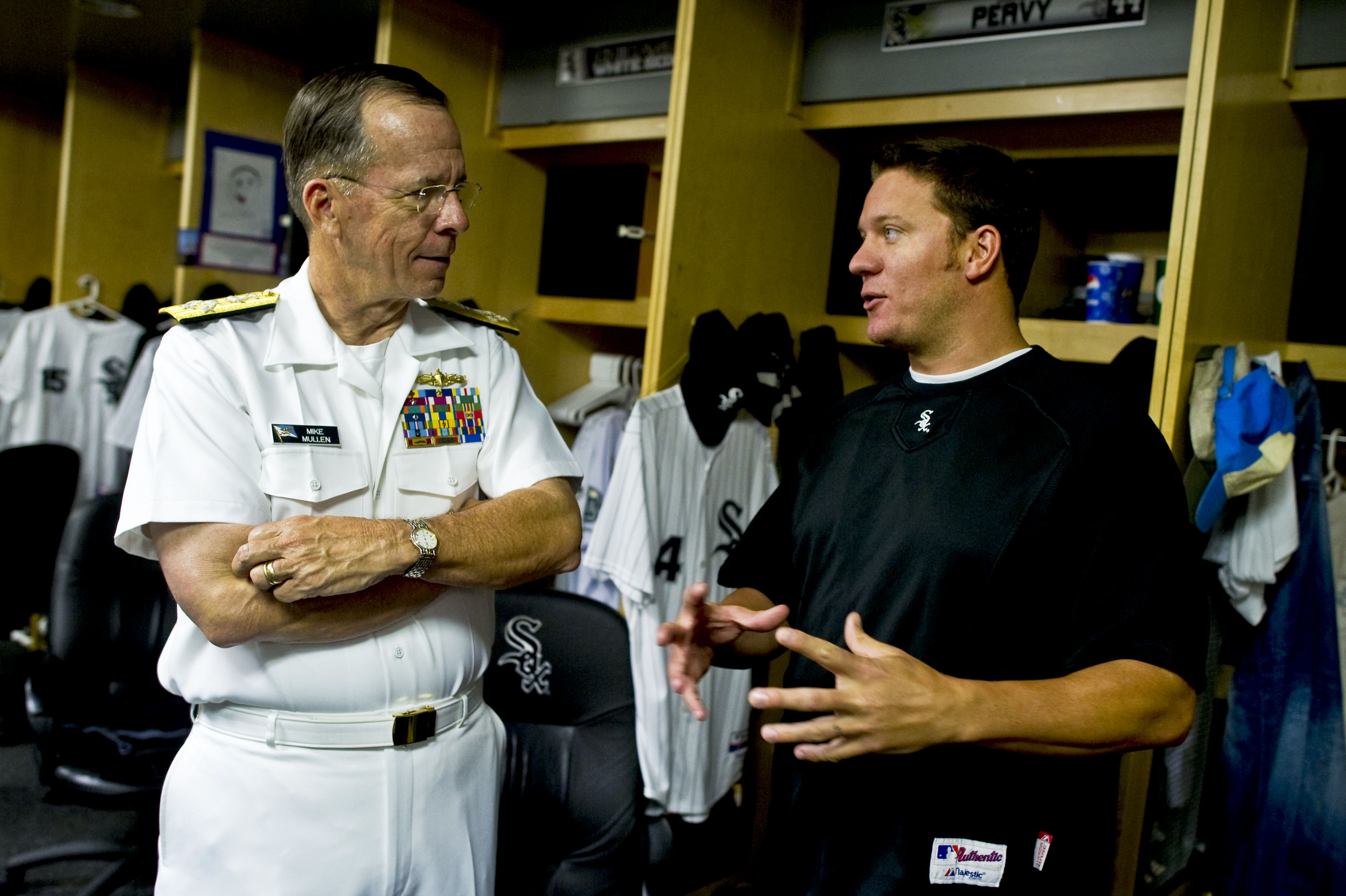
Peavy with Michael Mullen, 17th Chairman of the Joint Chiefs of Staff

In 2010, Peavy started 2–5 with a 6.05 ERA. Peavy then won five consecutive starts with a 1.99 ERA. On July 6, while pitching in the second inning against the Los Angeles Angels of Anaheim, Peavy injured his right arm and immediately walked off the field. He was diagnosed with a detached latissimus dorsi muscle in his back. He underwent surgery on July 14, 2010, at the Rush University Medical Center in Chicago and was knocked out for the remainder of the season.

Due to various injuries and fatigue, Peavy was limited to only pitching in 19 games in 2011. Peavy started 18 games and came out of the bullpen once for the first time ever in his MLB career. Peavy finished the season posting a win–loss record of 7–7 with an ERA of 4.92 and 95 strikeouts.

Peavy was named the AL Pitcher of the Month for April 2012, pitching 3–1 with a 1.67 ERA and 33 strikeouts in 5 starts, all quality starts. Peavy threw 2 consecutive complete games and one shutout. On July 8, 2012, Peavy was selected to the All-Star Game as a replacement for C. J. Wilson. Peavy was awarded the 2012 American League Gold Glove Award, sharing the award with Tampa Bay's Jeremy Hellickson. It was the first Gold Glove award of his career. On October 30, 2012, Peavy signed a two-year, $29 million extension with a vesting option for 2015, keeping him with the White Sox at least through the 2014 season.

On June 4, 2013, Peavy came out of a game against the Seattle Mariners in the fourth inning with a left rib fracture and was placed on the disabled list. Prior to that, he had registered a 4.30 ERA, 1.16 WHIP and 66/15 K/BB ratio in 67 innings. He was activated from the DL and made his first start against the Atlanta Braves on July 20.

=== Boston Red Sox (2013–2014) ===
On July 30, 2013, Peavy was traded to the Boston Red Sox along with Brayan Villarreal in a three-team trade, in which José Iglesias went to the Detroit Tigers and Avisail García, J. B. Wendelken, Frankie Montas and Cleuluis Rondon went to the White Sox. On August 3, Peavy had a winning debut as the Red Sox defeated the Arizona Diamondbacks 5–2.

On October 30, 2013, Peavy and his fellow Boston Red Sox teammates won the World Series, the first of Peavy's career. After the victory parade, in which Red Sox players and coaches rode through the streets of Boston on duck boats, Peavy purchased the duck boat that carried him and teammate Jon Lester, to commemorate the season.

=== San Francisco Giants (2014–2016) ===
On July 26, 2014, the Boston Red Sox traded Peavy to the San Francisco Giants along with cash considerations for pitching prospects Edwin Escobar and Heath Hembree. This trade reunited Peavy with manager Bruce Bochy. Having worn number 44 throughout his career, Peavy wore jersey number 43, since number 44 is retired in honor of Giants' Hall of Famer Willie McCovey.

After losing his first three quality starts as a Giant, including a perfect game through 6 1/3 innings, Peavy switched his jersey number from 43 to 22 for good luck; number 22 was his jersey number from Mobile, Alabama. On August 13, 2014, in a 7–1 home win over his former team the Chicago White Sox, Peavy recorded his first career win as a Giant after switching numbers. On August 30, 2014, in a 3–1 home win against the Milwaukee Brewers, Peavy struck out Aramis Ramírez for his 2,000th career strikeout, three days after teammate Tim Hudson got his. He did not allow a hit until the eighth inning to Mark Reynolds.

He won the first game of the 2014 NLDS against the Washington Nationals on October 3, 2014. On October 29, 2014, Peavy won his second consecutive World Series ring, despite losing both his starts, after the Giants defeated the Royals, 3–2, in Game 7. Peavy became the second starting pitcher after Don Gullett to win two consecutive World Series championship titles with two teams, one in each league. He is one of ten players in Major League history to win back-to-back World Series championship titles on different teams. (Will Smith, Joc Pederson, Ben Zobrist, Ryan Theriot, Jack Morris, Bill Skowron, Don Gullett, Clem Labine, and Allie Clark)

On December 19, 2014, Peavy agreed to a two-year deal worth $24 million to stay with the Giants. He went on to play with San Francisco through the 2016 season; in his three years with the Giants he had a 19–19 record and 3.97 ERA, with 238 strikeouts and 78 walks in 308 innings pitched. He became a free agent on November 3, 2016.

== Post-playing career ==
Peavy did not pitch in MLB or the minor leagues during the 2017 season. In May 2018, he stated his interest in a comeback. He officially announced his retirement on May 5, 2019. In 2023, he was announced as a new inductee of the San Diego Padres Hall of Fame.

On March 20, 2025, Peavy was named special assistant to San Diego Padres CEO Erik Greupner.

== Broadcasting career ==
In March 2022, Peavy joined MLB Network as an on-air analyst and has since appeared on multiple MLB Network shows including MLB Tonight.

== Scouting report ==
Peavy's repertoire included six pitches, although he mostly used a four-seam fastball at 88–92 mph and a slider in the low 80s. He also had a two-seam fastball, a curveball, a changeup, and a cutter. Peavy tended to throw the curve and change more against lefties, and he did not use his two-seamer or cutter often. Peavy's two-seam fastball acted primarily as a sinker and induced many ground balls. This allowed Peavy to induce many double plays when runners were on base. Peavy liked to run his fastballs in on lefties and make the pitch break back into the zone, similar to a power version of Greg Maddux's technique.

== Accomplishments ==
- 2× World Series Champion (2013, 2014)
- NL Cy Young Award (2007)
- NL Pitching Triple Crown (2007)
- NL Wins Champion (2007)
- 2× NL ERA Champion (2004, 2007)
- 2× NL Strikeouts Champion (2005, 2007)
- Rawlings Gold Glove Award (2012)
- 3× MLB All-Star (2005, 2007, 2012)
- 2x NL All-Star (2005, 2007)
- AL All-Star (2012)
- MLB All-Star Game NL Starting Pitcher (2007)
- Included on the ballot for the National Baseball Hall of Fame class of 2022, announced on November 22, 2021

== MLB Records ==
Regular season records

- Only starting pitcher to win two consecutive World Series' (2013 Boston Red Sox and 2014 San Francisco Giants) in both leagues (2013-2014)

San Diego Padres Records

- 1,348 career strikeouts
- 16 strikeouts in a single game on May 22, 2006, against the Atlanta Braves at Petco Park

== Personal life ==
Peavy married his high school sweetheart, Katie Alford, in 2000, when he was 19 years old. They have four sons: Jacob, Wyatt, Judson, and Waylon. Peavy's divorce was finalized on November 28, 2017, and he and his ex maintain joint custody of their children.

Peavy is legally blind without corrective lenses. He is an outspoken Christian and has been interviewed about his religion. Peavy has a tattoo on his forearm with the word "Outsider".

In 2008, Peavy bought a 5,000-acre (2,000 ha) ranch in Wilcox County, Alabama, called Southern Falls Plantation. The property includes a bowling alley, saloon, hunting lodge, and replica of Fenway Park. In 2013, Peavy bought for the plantation a World War II duck boat formerly used by Boston Duck Tours for tourist purposes and special events like the 2013 World Series Parade. He hopes it will become a family heirloom. During a World Series Game 6 pre-game press conference, Peavy's son let the media know that his dad would purchase the family a cable car for the ranch if the Giants won the 2014 World Series, which they did. Once shipped to Alabama, it was planned to be converted into a bar.

Peavy is a fan of Alabama Crimson Tide football and was invited to be a guest for ESPN's College Gameday on the campus of Alabama in 2013.

In 2015, Peavy stated he had been a smokeless tobacco user since he was in fifth grade.

Peavy started playing guitar in 2002 when he and Tim Flannery were with the San Diego Padres. He has since performed at several benefit concerts.

During the San Francisco Giants' 2016 spring training camp, Peavy learned that he had been the victim of a Ponzi-like scheme at the hands of his financial advisor who had siphoned away some $15 million to $20 million of his retirement savings.

== See also ==
- List of Chicago White Sox award winners and league leaders
- List of Major League Baseball career strikeout leaders
- List of people from Mobile, Alabama
- List of San Diego Padres team records
- San Diego Padres award winners and league leaders

Awards and achievements
Preceded by Russ Ortiz; John Maine; Carlos Zambrano	National League Pitcher of the month August 2004; May 2007; August 2007 – September 2007	Succeeded by Carlos Zambrano; Ben Sheets; Brandon Webb
Preceded by Randy Johnson	National League Pitching Triple Crown; 2007	Succeeded by Clayton Kershaw
Preceded by Brad Penny	National League All-Star Game Starting Pitcher; 2007	Succeeded by Ben Sheets
Preceded by Chris Carpenter	Players Choice NL Outstanding Pitcher; 2007	Succeeded by Tim Lincecum
Preceded by Doug Fister	American League Pitcher of the Month; April 2012	Succeeded by Incumbent
