= Ken Caminiti =

American baseball player (1963–2004)

- Caminiti with the Houston Astros, c. 2000
- Third baseman
- Born: April 21, 1963; Hanford, California, U.S.
- Died: October 10, 2004 (aged 41); The Bronx, New York, U.S.
- Batted: Switch Threw: Right

MLB debut
- July 16, 1987, for the Houston Astros

Last MLB appearance
- October 7, 2001, for the Atlanta Braves

MLB statistics
- Batting average: .272
- Home runs: 239
- Runs batted in: 983
- Stats at Baseball Reference

Teams
- Houston Astros (1987–1994); San Diego Padres (1995–1998); Houston Astros (1999–2000); Texas Rangers (2001); Atlanta Braves (2001)

Career highlights and awards
- 3× All-Star (1994, 1996, 1997); NL MVP (1996); 3× Gold Glove Award (1995–1997); Silver Slugger Award (1996); Houston Astros Hall of Fame; San Diego Padres Hall of Fame

Kenneth Gene Caminiti (April 21, 1963 – October 10, 2004) was an American professional baseball third baseman who spent 15 seasons in Major League Baseball (MLB) with the Houston Astros (1987–1994, 1999–2000), San Diego Padres (1995–1998), Texas Rangers (2001) and Atlanta Braves (2001).

Caminiti was named the National League Most Valuable Player (NL MVP) with San Diego in 1996, and he was a three-time MLB All-Star. Caminiti is a member of the Astros Hall of Fame and Padres Hall of Fame. He died of a cocaine and heroin (a speedball) drug overdose on October 10, 2004.

== Early years ==
Caminiti was born in Hanford, California, on April 21, 1963, to Yvonne and Lee Caminiti who had another son, Glenn, and a daughter, Carrie. He starred in football and baseball at Leigh High School in San Jose, California, where he graduated in 1981. In football, he was invited to many all-star games after his senior football season. He attended San Jose State University, where he played baseball for the Spartans in 1983 and 1984.

== Baseball career ==
=== Minor leagues ===
The Houston Astros selected Caminiti in the third round of the 1984 MLB draft. Caminiti played professional baseball for 15 seasons, beginning with the Osceola Astros of the Single-A Florida State League in 1985. He was promoted to the Double-A Columbus Astros in 1986, and batted .300 for the first time in his professional career. He returned to Columbus in 1987, improving to a .325 batting average, hitting 15 home runs over 95 games and making the Southern League All-Star game. He also played third base for the Indios de Mayagüez along with Wally Joyner in the Puerto Rico Winter League.

=== Houston Astros (1987–1994) ===
Skipping Triple-A, Caminiti was called up and made his major league debut at age 24 with the Houston Astros on July 16, 1987. In his debut, he went 2-for-3 with a home run, a triple, and scored the game-winning run. He immediately received a large role, starting 51 of the Astros' final 75 games at third base. However, in 1988, Denny Walling, whom Caminiti had largely replaced the previous season, was named the Astros starting third baseman, and Caminiti started the season in the minors, playing with the Triple-A Tucson Toros of the Pacific Coast League. Despite an injury forcing Walling to the disabled list in mid-June, the Astros did not call up Caminiti, instead trading for the veteran Buddy Bell. Further injuries in late July forced the Astros to shift Bell to first base in late July, and Caminiti was brought up to play at third base. However, Caminiti struggled, batting only .176 over three weeks, and was demoted again, only returning for September call-ups, and ended the season with a .181 batting average over 89 plate appearances.

Prior to 1989, the Astros' new manager Art Howe announced that Caminiti would be the starting third baseman. Despite being plagued with several injuries throughout his tenure in Houston, Caminiti became a constant presence at third base over the next six seasons, averaging .263 with 12 home runs and 69 RBIs from 1989 to 1994. During this time, he formed part of the nucleus of the Astros offense alongside future Hall of Famers Jeff Bagwell and Craig Biggio, plus Steve Finley and Luis Gonzalez (both of whom ended their careers with over 2500 hits and 300 home runs). Caminiti's Astros improved their record each year from 1991 to 1994. In the strike-shortened 1994 season, he set a new career high with 18 home runs, and earned his first All Star Game selection.

=== San Diego Padres (1995–1998) ===
After the 1994 season, Caminiti was traded by the Astros, in part to cut payroll and get younger, to the San Diego Padres in a 12-player trade (the biggest trade in terms of number of players moved since 1957), along with Steve Finley, Andújar Cedeño, Roberto Petagine, Brian Williams, and a player to be named later (PTBNL), in exchange for Derek Bell, Doug Brocail, Ricky Gutiérrez, Pedro Martínez, Phil Plantier, and Craig Shipley. In 1995, at the age of 32, he reached career highs at the plate by hitting .302 with 26 home runs and 94 RBIs in his first season for the Padres, winning his first of three consecutive Gold Glove Awards. The switch-hitting Caminiti also became the first player to ever have three games with a home run from each side of the plate, remarkably having entirely done so over a single four-game span.

In 1996, Caminiti again set new career highs, batting .326 with 40 home runs and 130 RBIs (which remains the Padres' single season RBI record). He carried the Padres that year despite a myriad of injuries, such as an abdominal strain, a biceps tendon tear, shoulder and elbow injuries, and pain in his back, hamstring, and groin. One highlight of the season was the August 18 game against the Mets in Monterrey, Mexico, which saw him play with dehydration and diarrhea. With liters of intravenous fluid received alongside a Snickers bar, Caminiti hit two home runs in the victory over the Mets. In spite of Caminiti's three home runs, the Padres were swept by the St. Louis Cardinals in three games in the NLDS. Despite playing most of 1996 with a torn left rotator cuff, his performance earned him his second All-Star Game appearance, and he became the fifth player to be unanimously voted the National League Most Valuable Player. He dropped off slightly in 1997, but remained productive, batting .290 with 26 home runs and 90 RBIs, and was voted the National League's starting third baseman for the All Star Game. Injuries took their toll, and Caminiti's batting average fell to .252 in 1998, though he maintained his power numbers. This season saw Caminiti make the World Series for the only time in his career, where the Padres were swept by a juggernaut New York Yankees team that had won a then-AL record 114 regular season games. He had two hits in the series and batted .143.

=== Return to Astros and end of career (1999–2001) ===
After 1998, the Padres did not attempt to re-sign the free agent eligible Caminiti in a cost-saving move. Despite reportedly being offered more money by the Detroit Tigers, Caminiti returned to Houston on a $9.5 million contract with an option for a third year at $5.5 million. Astros GM Gerry Hunsicker endorsed the signing, describing Caminiti as "the ultimate gamer." While he remained productive, injuries limited Caminiti to 137 games with the Astros between 1999 and 2000. In the 1999 National League Division Series against Atlanta and batted .471 with three of his eight hits being home runs. He drove in eight of Houston's total 15 runs in the four-game series loss to the Braves. His 2000 season was ended by a wrist injury in mid-June, and Caminiti left the team in early September to enter a substance abuse rehabilitation center.

Before the 2001 season, Caminiti signed for $3.25 million with the Texas Rangers, where he hit just .232 over the first three months of the season. He requested his release from the Rangers, which was granted on July 2. Three days later, he signed with the Atlanta Braves, who moved him across the infield due to the presence of Chipper Jones, and attempted to use Caminiti as a power-hitting first baseman. Over 64 games with the Braves, Caminiti batted only .222 with six home runs.

=== Awards ===
Caminiti won three Gold Glove Awards while playing for the Padres in 1995, 1996, and 1997, and he was unanimously selected as the National League's MVP in 1996. In 1994, 1996, and 1997, he appeared in the All Star Game. Caminiti is the Padres all-time leader in slugging percentage (.540) and OPS (.924).

In 2016, Caminiti was inducted into the San Diego Padres Hall of Fame. He was inducted into the Houston Astros Hall of Fame in August 2024.

== Post-baseball career ==
Following his playing career in baseball, Caminiti was hired by the Padres to be a spring training instructor for his former team. Caminiti entered into a partnership with actor Jason Gedrick and hockey player Mario Lemieux to open a cigar bar called Ashes Cigar Club on Wall Street.

== Personal life ==
Caminiti was married to Nancy Smith from November 14, 1987, to December 10, 2002. They had three daughters, Kendall, Lindsey, and Nicole. His cousin, Cam Caminiti, was drafted by the Atlanta Braves in the first round of the 2024 Major League Baseball draft.

== Substance abuse and death ==
Caminiti struggled with substance abuse throughout his career, as he had started drinking alcohol in middle school and smoking marijuana in high school. He started using cocaine later on, but his main vice by 1990 was crack cocaine. He admitted in 1994 to having a problem with alcoholism and checked himself into a rehabilitation center in 2000. In a Sports Illustrated cover story in 2002, a year after his retirement, Caminiti admitted that he had used steroids during his 1996 MVP season, and for several seasons afterwards. His admitted steroid abuse was discussed in the 2007 Mitchell Report on steroid abuse in baseball.

Caminiti also had a long struggle with cocaine, having been arrested in March 2001 for possession and sentenced to probation. In February 2003, Caminiti tested positive for cocaine while already on probation for cocaine possession and was ordered to visit a Texas Department of Criminal Justice-operated treatment program. The program was eliminated in May of that year and Caminiti was forced to leave after completing most of the program. Caminiti was also getting mental health therapy from the MLB's Employee Assistance Program, owing to childhood trauma from sexual abuse in middle school. He had recounted to others participating in rehab sessions that he believed this abuse was the driving force behind his substance use (serving as a way to try to turn his mind off from the memories).

On October 5, 2004 — just five days prior to his death — he admitted in a Houston court that he had violated his probation. He tested positive for cocaine in September 2004. It was his fourth such violation and he was sentenced to 180 days in jail but given credit for time already served and released.

=== Death ===
In the early afternoon of October 10, 2004, Caminiti was in the apartment of a friend in the Bronx, New York City. After being in the bathroom to have a speedball of cocaine and heroin, Caminiti came out and collapsed on the floor. At 3:36 pm, a 911 call was made while Caminiti was going into cardiac arrest. Caminiti died at Lincoln Hospital in the Bronx at 6:45 pm. Preliminary news reports indicated he died of a heart attack, but the autopsy results stated that "acute intoxication due to the combined effects of cocaine and opiates" caused his death, with coronary artery disease and cardiac hypertrophy (an enlarged heart) as contributing factors.

After final funeral services held in Solana Beach, California, a San Diego suburb, which were attended by many Padres players, past and present, Caminiti's remains were cremated and were interred at the Cambo Ranch in Sabinal, Texas, which Caminiti co-owned with former teammate Craig Biggio. Media coverage of Caminiti's death was almost completely overshadowed by that of Christopher Reeve, who also died in New York on the same day.

== See also ==
- List of doping cases in sport
- List of Major League Baseball career assists as a third baseman leaders
- List of Major League Baseball career games played as a third baseman leaders
- List of Major League Baseball career fielding errors as a third baseman leaders
- List of Major League Baseball career putouts as a third baseman leaders
- List of Major League Baseball career home run leaders
- List of San Diego Padres team records
- San Diego Padres award winners and league leaders

Awards and achievements
Preceded by Sammy Sosa	National League Player of the Month; August—September 1996	Succeeded by Larry Walker
