= Benito Santiago =

Puerto Rican baseball player (born 1965)

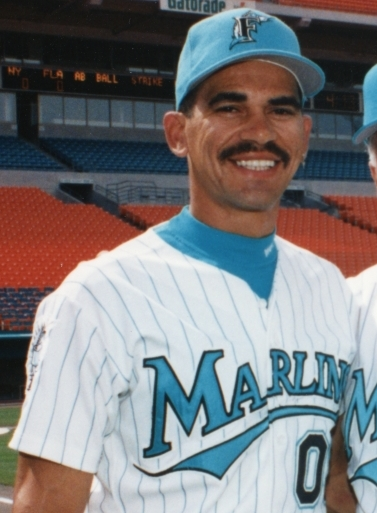
- Santiago with the Florida Marlins in 1993
- Catcher
- Born: March 9, 1965 (age 61); Ponce, Puerto Rico
- Batted: Right Threw: Right

MLB debut
- September 14, 1986, for the San Diego Padres

Last MLB appearance
- April 11, 2005, for the Pittsburgh Pirates

MLB statistics
- Batting average: .263
- Home runs: 217
- Runs batted in: 920
- Stats at Baseball Reference

Teams
- San Diego Padres (1986–1992); Florida Marlins (1993–1994); Cincinnati Reds (1995); Philadelphia Phillies (1996); Toronto Blue Jays (1997–1998); Chicago Cubs (1999); Cincinnati Reds (2000); San Francisco Giants (2001–2003); Kansas City Royals (2004); Pittsburgh Pirates (2005)

Career highlights and awards
- 5× All-Star (1989–1992, 2002); NL Rookie of the Year (1987); NLCS MVP (2002); 3× Gold Glove Award (1988–1990); 4× Silver Slugger Award (1987, 1988, 1990, 1991); San Diego Padres Hall of Fame

Benito Santiago Rivera (born March 9, 1965) is a Puerto Rican former professional baseball player. He played for 20 seasons as a catcher in Major League Baseball (MLB) from 1986 to 2005, most prominently as a member of the San Diego Padres where he was a four-time Silver Slugger Award winner as well as a three-time Gold Glove Award winner. The five-time All-Star was considered the premier catcher in the National League (NL) during his tenure with the Padres. In 2015, Santiago was inducted into the San Diego Padres Hall of Fame.

== Baseball career ==
=== Early years ===
Santiago was signed as an amateur free agent by the San Diego Padres on September 1, 1982. After playing four seasons in the minor leagues, he made his Major League debut with the Padres on September 14, 1986 at the age of 21. The next year, Santiago established a Major League record for a rookie by hitting safely in 34 straight games. It was also the longest hitting streak by a catcher in major league history. He ended the season with what would be career-highs in hits (164), doubles (33) and batting average (.300). Santiago was the unanimous selection for the 1987 National League Rookie of the Year Award. Although he struggled defensively, leading the league in errors and passed balls, his hitting performance earned him the 1987 Silver Slugger Award which is awarded annually to the best offensive player at each position.

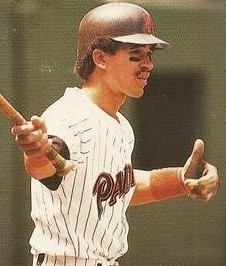
Santiago with the San Diego Padres

While Santiago initially made an impression with his offensive statistics, he soon became known for his defensive prowess, most notably for his strong throwing arm. Santiago was known for his ability to throw out would be base stealers from a kneeling position. In 1988, he led National League catchers in assists and in baserunners caught stealing with a 45% average when the league average was 30%. Although he still led the league's catchers with 12 errors, it was an improvement over the 22 he had committed the previous season. Santiago was awarded the first of three consecutive Gold Glove Awards in 1988. Santiago also claimed his second successive Silver Slugger Award as the Padres improved to finish in third place in the National League Western Division.

Although he was hitting for only a .236 average at mid-season in 1989, his defensive reputation earned him the starting catcher's role in the 1989 All-Star Game. He was awarded the 1989 National League Gold Glove Award for catchers, as the Padres climbed to second place in the season's final standings.

Santiago rebounded in 1990 and was hitting for a .317 batting average with 9 home runs in mid-June when he was hit by a pitch and had to miss six weeks of the season. He finished the season with a .270 average along with 11 home runs and 53 runs batted in to earn his third Silver Slugger Award. He was also named as a reserve player for the National League team in the 1990 All-Star Game and won his third consecutive Gold Glove Award.

Before the 1991 season, Santiago asked for a four-year contract worth $11 million, but lost his arbitration case and was awarded a one-year contract worth $1.65 million. A disgruntled Santiago announced that he would leave the Padres when he became eligible for free agency after the 1992 season. He was also disillusioned when the Padres traded away players such as Joe Carter and Jack Clark. In June, Padres manager Greg Riddoch benched Santiago for his lack of hustle on the playing field. Despite the difficulties, Santiago led the league's catchers with 100 assists and posted a career-high 87 runs batted in.

Santiago returned to arbitration before the 1992 season, this time winning a $3.3 million one-year contract that made him the highest paid catcher in professional baseball. In September 1992, the Padres announced that they would not seek to re-sign Santiago, in what was seen as a cost-cutting measure.

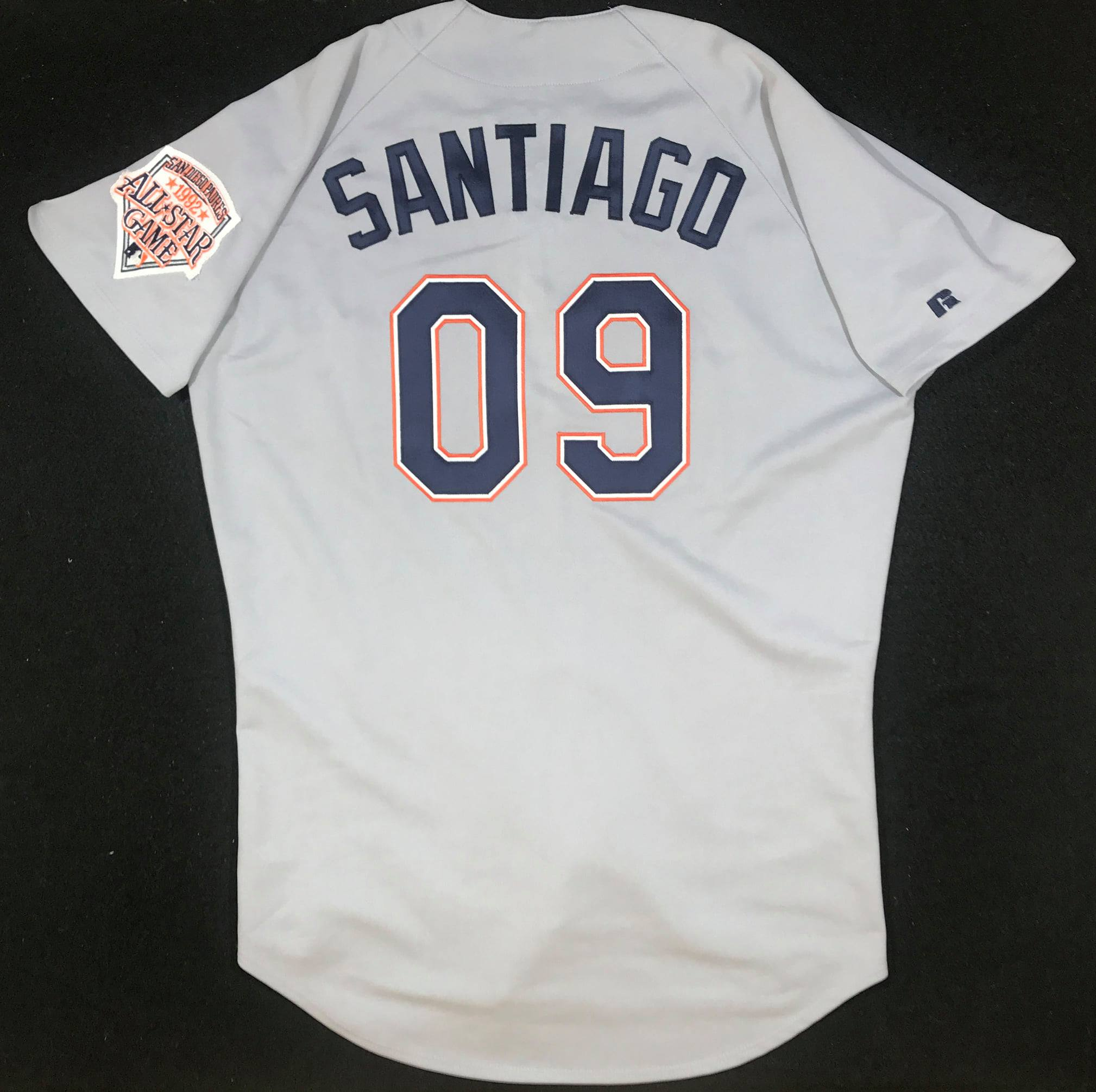
San Diego Padres 1992 #09 Benito Santiago road jersey

From 1991 to 1994, Santiago wore a jersey with the uniform number 09, making him one of the only major professional sports players to have ever worn a jersey with a leading zero as part of his uniform number. The two-digit jersey number was so that the vertical strap on the back of his chest protector wouldn't cover up the "9".

=== Decline and trades ===
On December 16, 1992, Santiago signed with the newly established franchise Florida Marlins and hit the first home run in team history. Despite hitting for a .273 average in 1994, he was granted free agency after the season as the Marlins were ready to promote their young catching prospect, Charles Johnson. On April 17, 1995, the Cincinnati Reds signed him and he briefly recovered his form batting .286. On January 30, 1996, he joined the Phillies, where he became the first player to hit a grand slam off Greg Maddux in the regular season after Maddux had been pitching for nearly ten years. Santiago also hit a home run in four consecutive at bats in the same season. Santiago ended the season with a career-high 30 home runs, along with 85 runs batted in, for the last place Phillies.

Santiago then signed a contract to play for the Blue Jays (1997–1998) where he lost almost the entire 1998 season to a serious injury sustained in a car crash in Florida. A free agent again, he played 89 games for the Cubs in 1999 and played for Cincinnati in 2000.

=== Resurgence with the Giants ===
Santiago arrived in San Francisco on March 17, 2001. He played in 133 games and helped the Giants finish in second place, two games behind the Arizona Diamondbacks in the National League West. He shared the 2001 Willie Mac Award with Mark Gardner, which recognized the spirit and leadership of each. Santiago had another good year in 2002, appearing in 126 games and finishing third among National League catchers with a .995 fielding percentage. He earned his fifth All-Star berth and ended the season with a .278 batting average with 74 runs batted in as the Giants once again finished second to the Diamondbacks and claimed the National League wild card berth.

The Giants defeated the Atlanta Braves in the first round of the play-offs then met the St. Louis Cardinals in the 2002 National League Championship Series. Santiago hit two home runs in the series along with 6 runs batted in, and was awarded the League Championship Series Most Valuable Player Award as the Giants defeated the Cardinals in five games. In the 2002 World Series against the Anaheim Angels, Santiago delivered 5 runs batted in as the Giants were defeated in a seven-game series.

In 2003, the 38-year-old Santiago continued to perform well, hitting fifth in the batting order behind Barry Bonds, he appeared in 108 games while posting a .279 batting average with 56 runs batted in.

=== Later years ===
On December 11, 2003, Santiago, again a free agent, signed with the Kansas City Royals. By June 18, he was hitting .274 with six home runs and 23 RBI when he was hit by a pitch from Geoff Geary that broke his hand. After the 2004 season, the Royals traded him to the Pittsburgh Pirates for Leo Núñez, a minor league pitcher. The Pirates let Santiago go after a mere 23 at-bats in favor of giving playing time to young David Ross. Santiago signed with the New York Mets to a minor-league contract, but he appeared in only a handful of games. He opted out of his Triple-A contract, but did not play in the major leagues in 2006.

He was inducted into the San Diego Padres Hall of Fame on August 8, 2015.

== Career statistics ==
In a 20-year major league career, Santiago played in 1,978 games, accumulating 1,830 hits in 6,951 at bats for a .261 career batting average along with 217 home runs, 920 runs batted in and an on-base percentage of .307. He ended his career with a .987 fielding percentage.

A five-time All-Star, Santiago was known for his strong defensive skills, leading National League catchers three times in assists, once in fielding percentage and once in baserunners caught stealing. As 2010 began, Santiago was tied for eighth on the all-time list of games caught with Brad Ausmus, with 1,917.

== Steroid allegations ==
In 2003, Santiago was named by FBI investigators as one of the athletes alleged to have received anabolic steroids. He was linked to performance enhancers in the book Game of Shadows.

On December 13, 2007, Santiago was named in the Mitchell Report. "At the end of the 2003 season, Mike Murphy, a Giants clubhouse attendant, was cleaning out Santiago's locker when he found a sealed package of syringes," the report read. "Murphy brought the syringes to the training room, handed them to [Stan] Conte, and told Conte that he had found them in Santiago's locker. Conte responded that he "would take care of it." Murphy recalled that the Giants’ assistant athletic trainer Dave Groeschner also was present in the training room during this conversation."

== Personal life ==
Santiago has a son named Benito Santiago Jr., who is a Puerto Rican professional basketball player who currently plays for the Mets of Guaynabo Coached by JJ Barea in the Baloncesto Superior Nacional (BSN), the top tier basketball league in Puerto Rico.

== See also ==
- List of Major League Baseball career putouts as a catcher leaders
- List of Major League Baseball players from Puerto Rico
- List of Major League Baseball players named in the Mitchell Report
- San Diego Padres award winners and league leaders
