= Ron Slocum =

American baseball player (1945–1988)

- Utilityman
- Born: July 2, 1945; Modesto, California, U.S.
- Died: August 25, 1988 (aged 43); Los Angeles, California, U.S.
- Batted: Right Threw: Right

MLB debut
- September 8, 1969, for the San Diego Padres

Last MLB appearance
- April 18, 1971, for the San Diego Padres

MLB statistics
- Batting average: .150
- Home runs: 2
- Runs batted in: 16
- Stats at Baseball Reference

Teams
- San Diego Padres (1969–1971)

Ronald Reece Slocum (July 2, 1945 — August 25, 1988) was an American professional baseball player. Slocum appeared in 80 games for the San Diego Padres of Major League Baseball during that team's first three seasons of existence, including the entire 1970 season. A catcher and third baseman when he entered professional baseball, he was a utility infielder and backup catcher for San Diego, playing a near-equal number of games at third base, catcher, shortstop and second base. He threw and batted right-handed, stood 6 feet 2 inches (1.88 m) tall and weighed 180 pounds (82 kg).

Slocum attended Helix High School. He was initially signed by the Pittsburgh Pirates and spent five seasons (1964–1968) in their minor league system before his newly created hometown team, the MLB Padres, chose him as the 55th overall selection in the National League's portion of the 1968 Major League Baseball expansion draft. Slocum spent the 1969 minor league season with the Double-A Elmira Pioneers before his recall by the Padres in September.

== Major League career ==
On September 16 at San Diego Stadium, against the Houston Astros, he started at third base and collected his first two Major League hits, a single off Tom Griffin and a two-run home run off Jack Billingham. Overall, he batted .292 in 13 games, and won a job as a utility player on the 1970 San Diego roster the following season.

Slocum played in 60 games for the 1970 Padres, but in 71 at bats he could muster only ten hits, including his second MLB home run, two doubles and two triples. He was the starting second baseman on July 21, 1970 — the day that Padre manager Preston Gómez controversially used a pinch hitter (Cito Gaston) for Clay Kirby in the eighth inning of a game in which Kirby was throwing a no-hitter against the New York Mets (although Kirby left the game trailing 1–0).

In 1971, Slocum again made the Padre opening-season roster, but he went hitless in 18 April at bats and was sent to the Triple-A Hawaii Islanders, where he spent the remainder of his career. He retired in 1972.

== Death ==
Ronald Slocum died in 1988 from AIDS, though news of his death did not reach researchers until 2014. He was survived by his two children and eight grandchildren.
