= Fernando Tatís Jr. =

Dominican baseball player (born 1999)

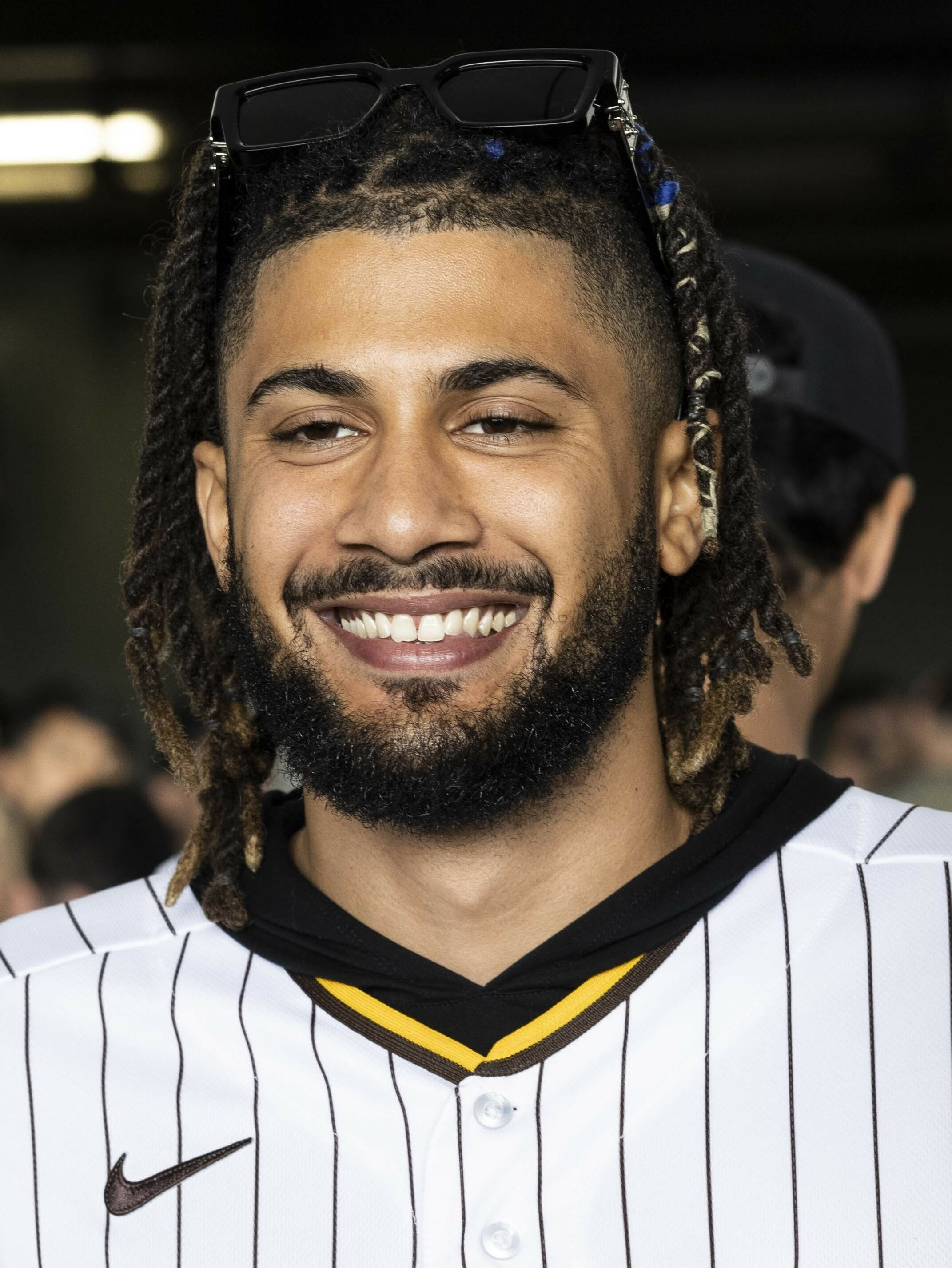
- Tatís with the San Diego Padres in 2023

San Diego Padres – No. 23
- Right fielder / Second baseman / Shortstop
- Born: January 2, 1999 (age 27); San Pedro de Macorís, Dominican Republic
- Bats: Right Throws: Right

MLB debut
- March 28, 2019, for the San Diego Padres

MLB statistics (through 2026 season)
- Batting average: .279
- Home runs: 177
- Runs batted in: 476
- Stolen bases: 162
- Stats at Baseball Reference

Teams
- San Diego Padres (2019–present)

Career highlights and awards
- 3× All-Star (2021, 2024, 2025); 3× All-MLB First Team (2020, 2021, 2026); 2× Gold Glove Award (2023, 2025); 2× Silver Slugger Award (2020, 2021); NL home run leader (2021)
Medals
Men's baseball
Representing Dominican Republic
World Baseball Classic
Bronze medal – third place	2026 Miami	Team

Fernando Gabriel Tatís Medina Jr. (tah-TEES; born January 2, 1999), nicknamed "El Niño" and "El Bebo", is a Dominican professional baseball right fielder and infielder for the San Diego Padres of Major League Baseball (MLB). He is the son of former MLB player Fernando Tatís Sr.

Tatís made his MLB debut in 2019 as a shortstop. He won the Silver Slugger Award in 2020 and signed a 14-year, $340 million contract extension before the 2021 season. He was named an All-Star in 2021 and won a second Silver Slugger Award, before missing the 2022 season due to injury and a suspension for using a performance-enhancing substance. Tatís has won Platinum Glove Awards in 2023 and 2025. Tatís made All-Star appearances again in 2024 and 2025.

== Early life ==
Tatís was born in San Pedro de Macorís, Dominican Republic. His father, Fernando Sr., was already playing in his third year of Major League Baseball (MLB), playing for the St. Louis Cardinals when Fernando Jr. was born. Fernando Jr. held an interest in baseball from a young age, and was athletic and spent a lot of time in big league clubhouses. He often practiced with Robinson Canó, who is also from San Pedro de Macorís.

== Professional career ==
=== Minor leagues ===
The Chicago White Sox signed Tatís as an international free agent from the Dominican Prospect League in 2015. On June 4, 2016, before he had played a professional game, the White Sox traded Tatís, then 17 years old, and Erik Johnson to the Padres for James Shields. Tatís spent 2016 with the Arizona League Padres of the Rookie-level Arizona League and the Tri-City Dust Devils of the Class A-Short Season Northwest League, batting a combined .273 with four home runs and 25 runs batted in (RBIs) in 55 games; on defense, he made 15 errors and had a .904 fielding percentage.

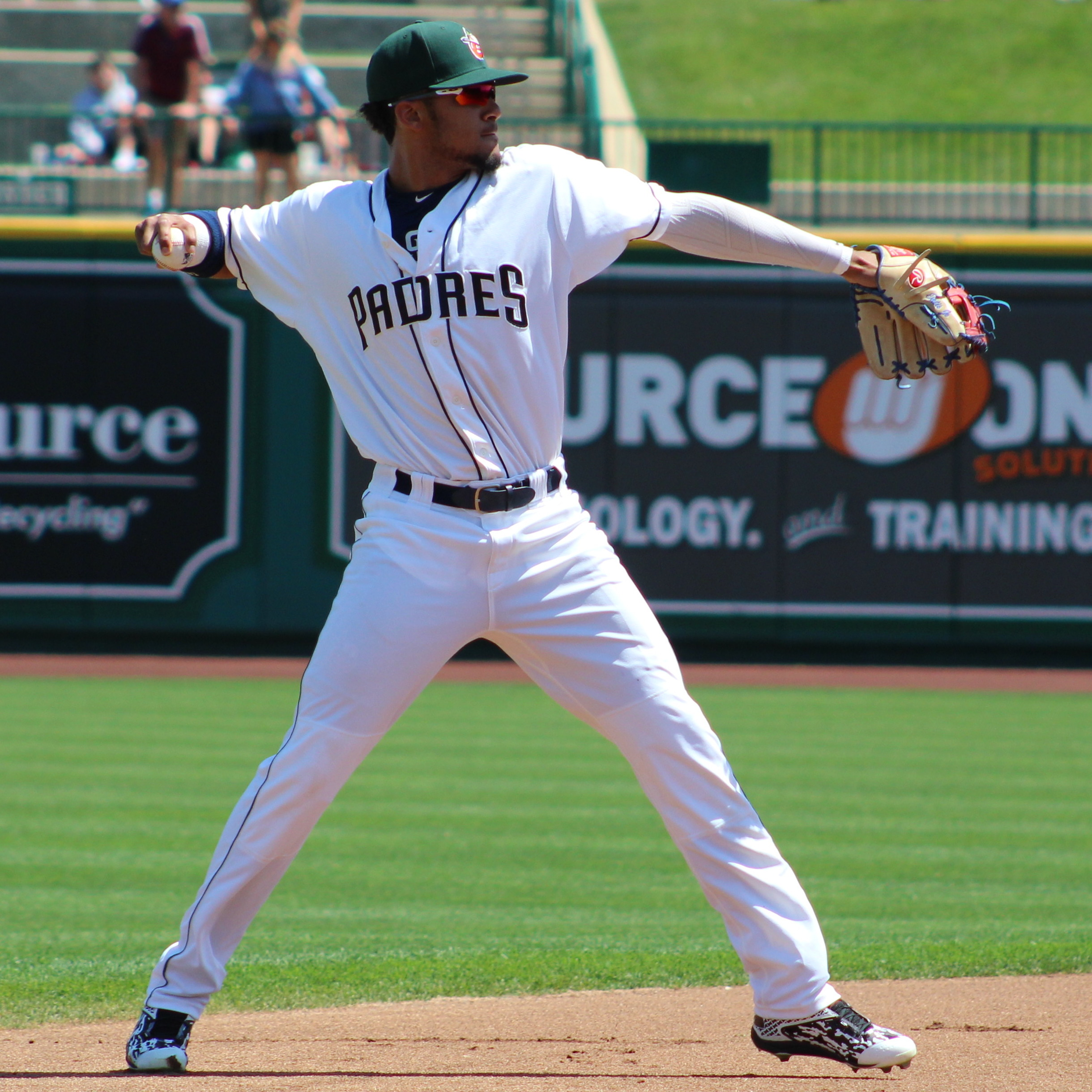
Tatís with the Fort Wayne TinCaps in 2017

In 2017, Tatís played 117 games for the Fort Wayne TinCaps of the Class A Midwest League and 14 games for the San Antonio Missions of the Class AA Texas League, posting a combined .278 batting average with 22 home runs, 75 RBIs, and 32 stolen bases as he was caught 15 times, and on defense, he made 30 errors and had a .936 fielding percentage. In 2017–18, he played 17 games at shortstop for the Estrellas de Oriente of the Dominican Winter League, batting .246 with one home run and three RBIs.

Tatís entered 2018 as one of the top prospects in the minor leagues. He returned to play shortstop for San Antonio, and in 88 games he batted .286 with 16 home runs, 43 RBIs, and 16 stolen bases. On July 23, 2018, Tatís underwent season-ending surgery for a broken left thumb and ligament damage suffered during a head-first slide. He returned to play for the Estrellas for the 2018–19 winter season.

=== San Diego Padres (2019–present) ===
==== 2019 season ====
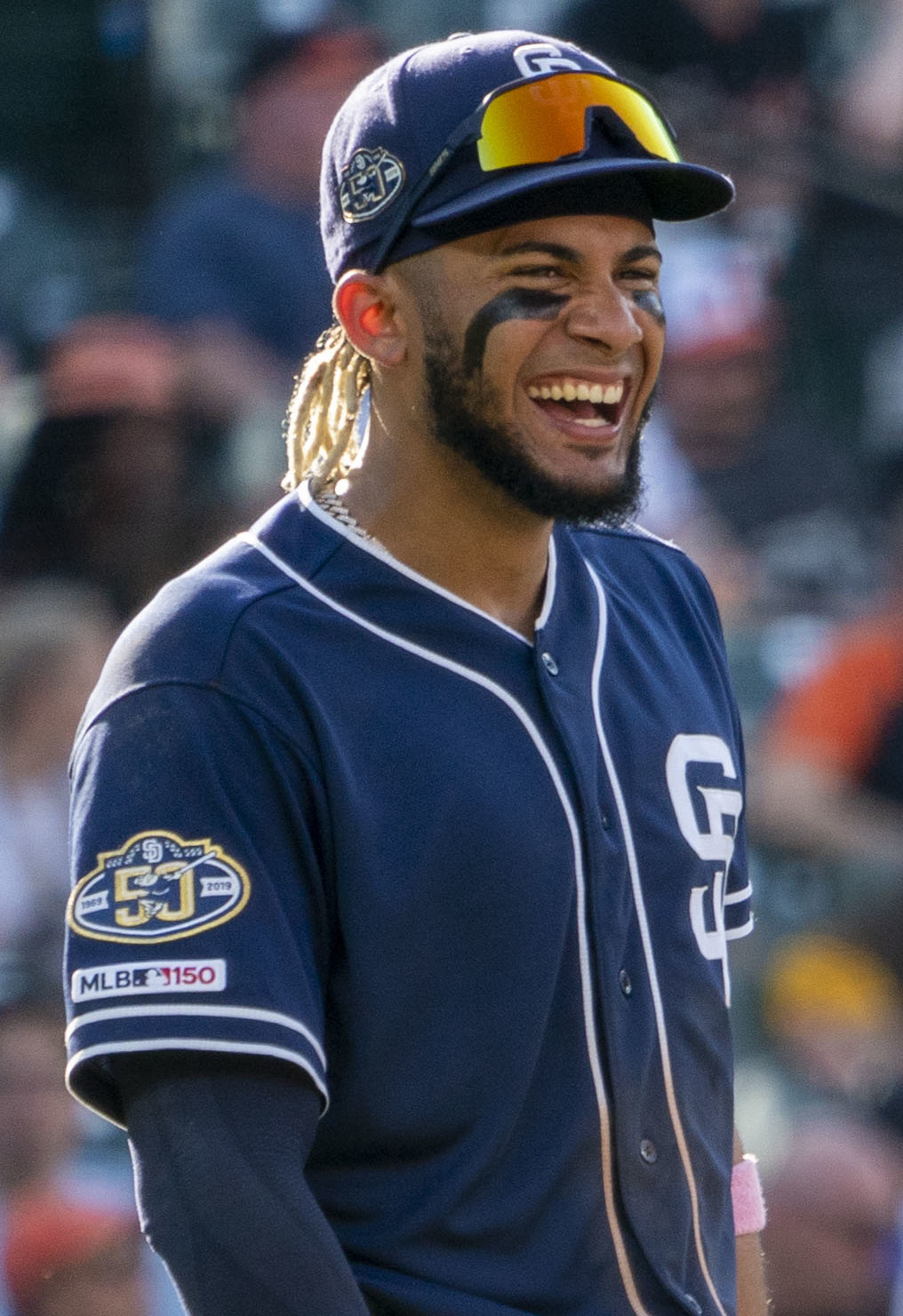
Tatís during his rookie season in 2019

At the beginning of 2019, Tatís was ranked as one of the top three prospects in baseball by MLB Pipeline, ESPN, Baseball America, and Baseball Prospectus. On March 26, 2019, the Padres announced that Tatís made their Opening Day roster. In his major league debut, he recorded two hits against the San Francisco Giants. On April 1, 2019, Tatís hit his first major league home run.

In August, Tatís injured his back, which ended his 2019 season. He finished the season with a slash line of .317/.379/.590 along with 22 home runs, 61 runs, and 106 hits over 84 games. He came in third place in balloting for the National League Rookie of the Year Award, behind Pete Alonso and Michael Soroka.

==== 2020 season ====
In the 2020 season, Tatís was part of a four-game streak in August in which the San Diego Padres hit four grand slams, and, notably, was at each base position over the four. There was a controversy involving Tatís when he swung at a 3–0 pitch in the eighth inning, hitting an opposite-field grand slam against the Texas Rangers. This caused some discussion at the time regarding breaking an "unwritten rule of baseball" since the Padres were already up by seven runs.

In 2020, Tatís led the NL in power-speed number (13.4) and batted .277/.366/.571 (10th in the league) with 50 runs (2nd), 17 home runs (2nd), 42 RBIs (4th), and 11 stolen bases (4th) in 224 at-bats. Of all major league hitters, he had the highest average exit velocity (95.9 MPH), percentage of hard-hit balls (62.2), and percentage of barrels/plate appearance (12.5%).

In Game 2 of the 2020 Wild Card Series against the St. Louis Cardinals, Tatís was able to help bring the Padres back into winning position by hitting two home runs that made it possible for the Padres to win the series and head to the next round against the Dodgers, which they lost in three straight games.

Tatís finished in fourth place for the National League MVP Award in 2020, behind Freddie Freeman, Mookie Betts, and his teammate Manny Machado.

==== 2021 season ====
Before the 2021 season, Tatís signed a 14-year, $340 million contract extension with the Padres, at the time the third-richest in MLB history, behind deals signed by Mike Trout and Mookie Betts, and the richest signed by a player not yet eligible for salary arbitration. Part of Tatís's future earnings will be given to Big League Advance as part of an agreement Tatís made while in the minor leagues in order to receive early money that he used to "afford a personal trainer, higher quality food, and better housing".

On April 5, Tatís sustained a left shoulder subluxation while swinging at a pitch during a game against the San Francisco Giants. He was subsequently placed on the 10-day injured list, but avoided serious injury and returned to the Padres lineup on April 16.

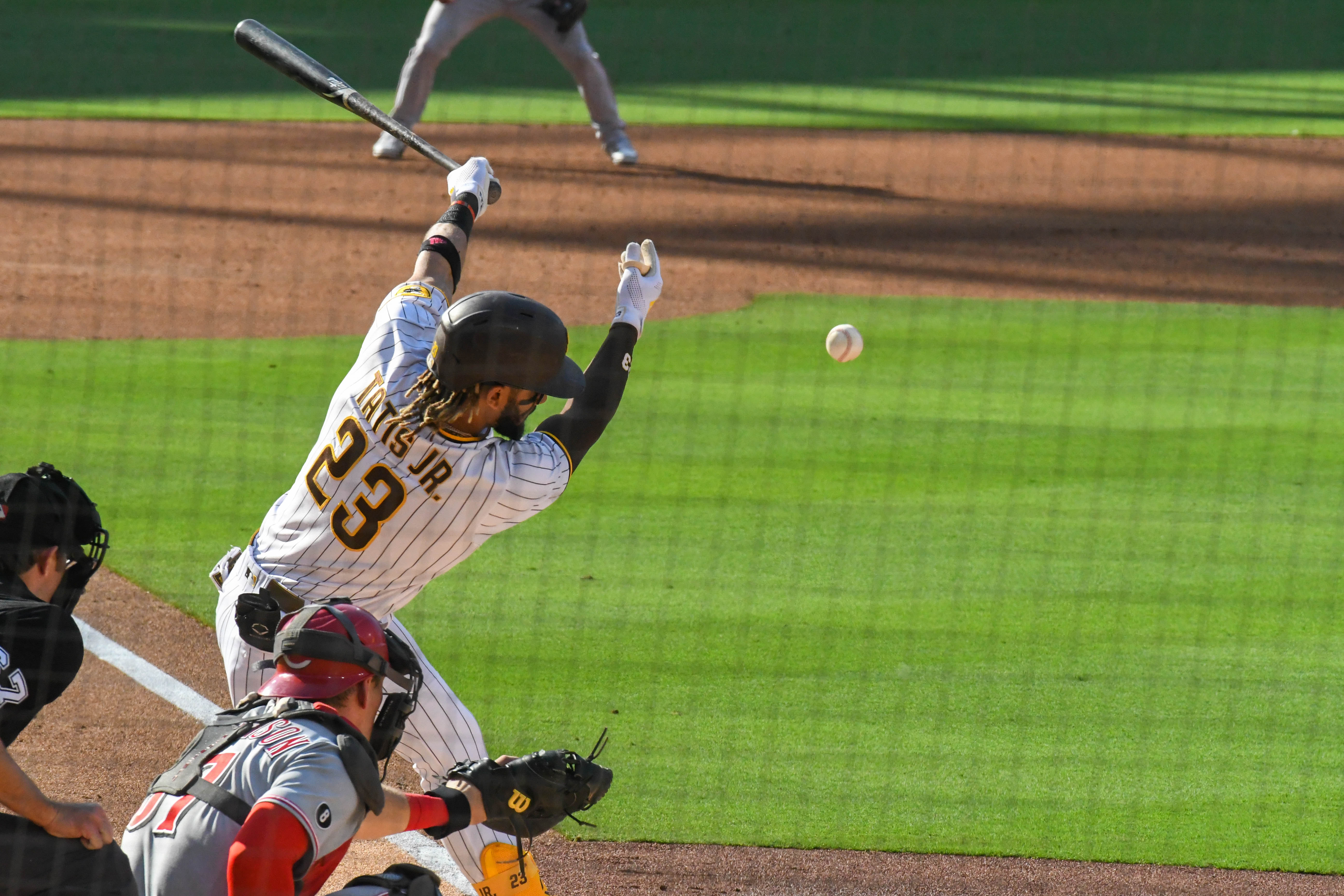
Tatís hitting a ground ball during a game in the 2021 season

On April 23, exactly 22 years after his father hit two grand slams in one inning, Tatís hit two home runs off of Clayton Kershaw, and he also hit two more home runs in another game off of Trevor Bauer. All four home runs took place at the same venue where Tatís's father made history as well. The Padres won 6–1.

On May 12, players from the San Diego Padres, including Tatís and Wil Myers, tested positive for COVID-19; Tatís was placed on the injured list due to COVID-19. On May 19, the Padres activated Tatís from the COVID-19 IL.

On June 2, Tatís was named the National League Player of the Month for May, batting .353/.440/.824 with nine home runs, eight stolen bases, 26 RBIs, and 21 runs scored in 20 games. On June 25, Tatís had his first three-homer game in his career against the Arizona Diamondbacks to give the Padres an 11–5 win.

On July 1, Tatís was selected to start his first All-Star Game, becoming the first All-Star starter from the Padres since Tony Gwynn. In a July 6, 2021, game, Tatís received media attention for an unusually high catch, which appeared to resemble a double jump typically seen in video games. On July 24, Tatís hit his 30th home run of the season, becoming the fourth Padres player to have hit 30 home runs and stolen 20 bases in a season, after Steve Finley, Wil Myers, and Ryan Klesko. He accomplished this feat over 82 games, the lowest for any player age 22 or younger.

Tatís suffered a second left shoulder subluxation while playing against the Colorado Rockies on July 30 and was placed on the 10-day IL. During his stint on the IL, Tatís trained with Padres first base coach Wayne Kirby to transition into an outfielder. He was activated from the IL on August 15 and played right field in his first game back from injury.

Tatís finished the 2021 season hitting .282/.364/.611 with 97 RBIs, 25 stolen bases, and an NL-leading 42 home runs. He also led the majors in at-bats per home run (11.4), and the highest percentage of hard-hit balls (48%). He won his second consecutive Silver Slugger Award and finished third in NL MVP voting behind Bryce Harper and Juan Soto.

==== 2022 season ====
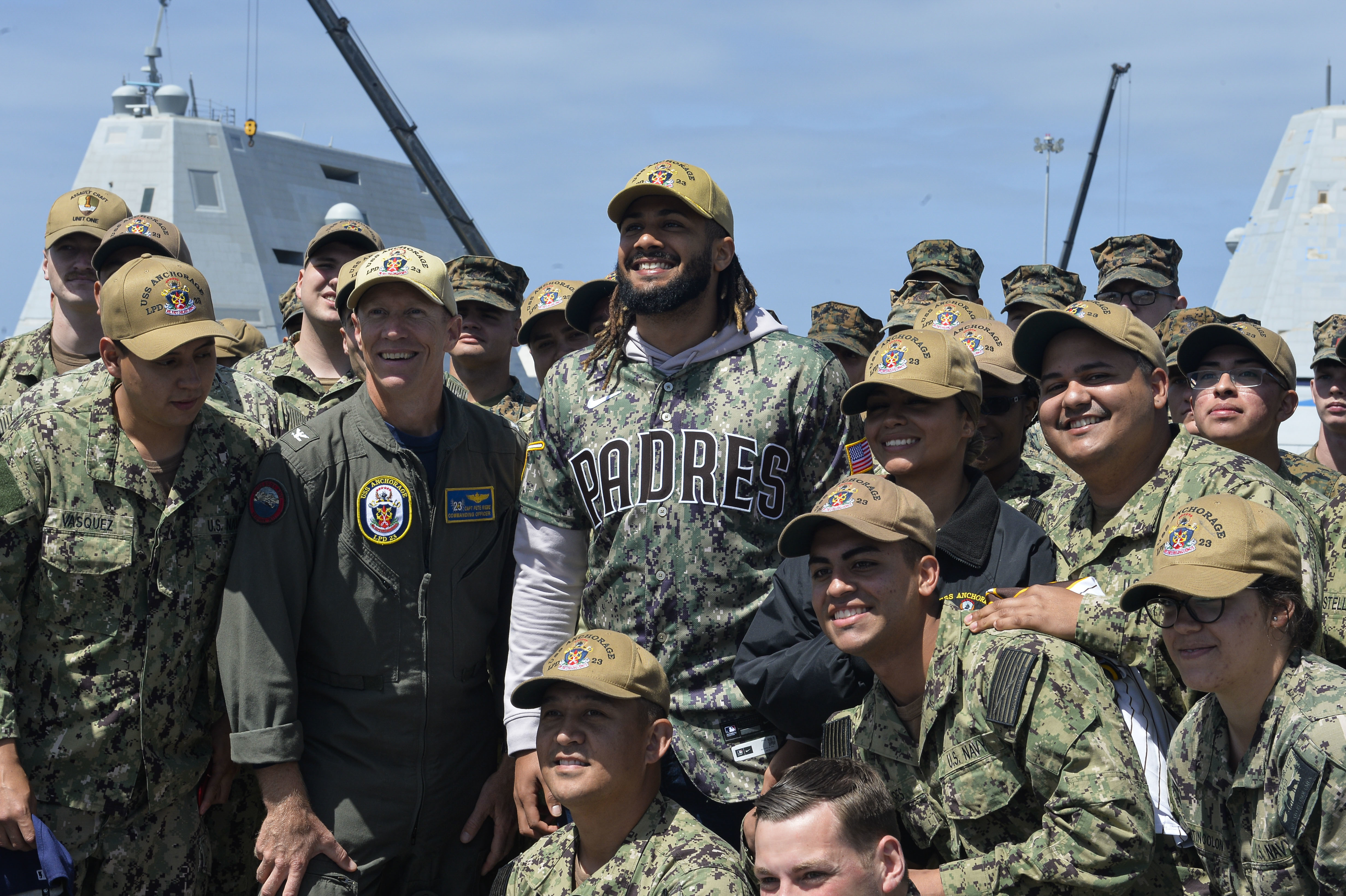
Tatís aboard the USS Anchorage (LPD-23) while recovering from surgery in 2022

On March 16, 2022, Tatís underwent surgery due to a fractured scaphoid bone suffered during the offseason. He was expected to return within three months. Although the cause of the injury was not confirmed, general manager A. J. Preller alluded to a motorcycle accident that Tatís suffered in December 2021 in the Dominican Republic. When a reporter asked when his motorcycle accident occurred, Tatís replied "Which one?," suggesting that he had been involved in multiple such accidents in the 2021–22 offseason.

On August 12, 2022, Tatís was suspended for 80 games after testing positive for Clostebol, an anabolic steroid. He stated this was from a medication he took to treat ringworm that he did not check for steroids, which drew skepticism. On August 27, 2022, Adidas announced that they would be dropping Tatís from his sponsorship with the athletic company, citing, "We believe that sport should be fair," Adidas said in a statement via ESPN. "We have a clear policy on doping and can confirm that our partnership with Fernando Tatis Jr. will not continue."

==== 2023 season ====
As a result of punishment stemming from his failed drug test in 2022, Tatís missed the first 20 games of the 2023 season.

While playing for the Padres' Triple-A affiliate El Paso Chihuahuas, Tatís recorded 17 hits and 15 RBIs in 33 at bats, including a three-home run, eight-RBI game on April 13, 2023. With the Padres signing free agent shortstop Xander Bogaerts, Tatís was moved to right field, where he won a Gold Glove after leading all NL defenders with 27 defensive runs saved. His 12 assists were the second most among NL outfielders, trailing only Lane Thomas. He was also voted by fans as the winner of the Platinum Glove Award. In the 2023 season, Tatís slashed .257/.322/.449 with 25 home runs and 78 runs batted in in 141 major league games.

==== 2024 season ====
Tatís began the year with San Diego, playing in 80 games and slashing .279/.354/.468 with 14 home runs and 36 RBI. On June 24, 2024, he was placed on the injured list with a femoral stress reaction in his right quadricep. Tatis was transferred to the 60–day injured list on August 21. He was activated on September 2. He finished with the season playing 102 games and batting .276/.340/.492 with 21 home runs and 49 RBI.

On October 6, in Game 2 of the National League Division Series against the Los Angeles Dodgers, Tatís hit two home runs in a single game. His first home run of the game puts the Padres on the board 1–0 in the top of the first, and his second home run of the game in the top of the ninth extended the Padres lead to 10–1 that set the Padres' franchise postseason record of 6 home runs in a single postseason game.

==== 2025 season ====
On May 3, 2025 against the Pittsburgh Pirates, Tatís stole his 100th career base when he stole third base in the top of the ninth inning. On May 5, Tatis was ejected for the first time in his career after arguing with home plate umpire Adrian Johnson over a strike call. On May 13, Tatís hit his first career walk-off home run when he hit a two-run homer off Angels closer Kenley Jansen and gave the Padres a 6–4 victory over the Los Angeles Angels. He finished with the season playing 155 games and slashing .268/.368/.446 with 25 home runs and 71 RBI

==== 2026 season ====
On April 11, the Padres played Tatís as a second baseman. He began the season going homerless in his first 55 games and 238 at-bats. On August 18, in a 5–2 win over the New York Mets, he hit two home runs off Zac Thornton, including a 452-foot shot on the first pitch of the game. In the second inning, Tatís reached over the right field wall to rob Francisco Lindor of a grand slam. He batted 307/.385/.610 after the All-Star break, when he slugged 20 of his 25 homers. His on-base plus slugging (OPS) percentage of .996 after the break was the second highest in the major leagues.

Tatís finished the 2026 season batting .289/.358/.470 with 25 home runs and 83 RBIs. He set career highs with 181 hits, 294 total bases and 38 stolen bases. He was also tied with Lázaro Montes for the longest home run of the year in MLB, going 474 feet in a game against the Atlanta Braves at Truist Park on July 21, 2026.

== Player profile ==
Tatís, a 6 ft 3 in, 217 lb (1.90 m, 98 kg) outfielder and shortstop, has been described as a five-tool player by MLB.com due to his skills in hitting, hitting for power, fielding, throwing, and running. In his 2021 season, Tatís hit 42 home runs, the most in the National League that year. He is only the fifth Padres player to hit 40+ home runs in a single season. His .282 batting average in 2021 was the highest among leaderboard-qualified Padres batters. Tatís posted an average sprint speed of 29.3 feet per second through his first three seasons and placed in the 98th percentile of all MLB baserunners in 2020.

In 2019, Tatís committed 18 errors, the fifth-most in MLB that season. Although he committed only three errors in the shortened 2020 season and raised his fielding percentage 40 points to .984, he committed 21 errors in 2021, the third-most in the league that year. Critics have alleged that Tatís's highlight-reel defensive plays distract from his inconsistency on easy plays. Although he was described as a subpar defender at shortstop, he has been touted for his defense since he moved to right field in 2023.

Tatís has been credited as one of the most exciting star players in baseball. ESPN ranked him as the most entertaining MLB player in 2020.

== Personal life ==
Tatís's father played third base in the major leagues from 1997 to 2010. His mother is named Maria. His younger brother, Elijah, was an infielder in the Chicago White Sox organization; he signed in 2019. Tatís is the cover athlete of MLB The Show 21, and at age 22, the youngest player to be featured as the cover star.

== See also ==
- List of largest sports contracts
- List of Major League Baseball annual home run leaders
- List of Major League Baseball players from the Dominican Republic
- List of Major League Baseball players suspended for performance-enhancing drugs
- List of Major League Baseball postseason records
- List of second-generation Major League Baseball players
- San Diego Padres award winners and league leaders

Awards and achievements
Preceded by Eugenio Suárez; Ronald Acuña Jr.	National League Player of the Month; August 2020; May 2021	Succeeded by Freddie Freeman; Kyle Schwarber
