= San Diego Padres Hall of Fame =

Baseball hall of fame

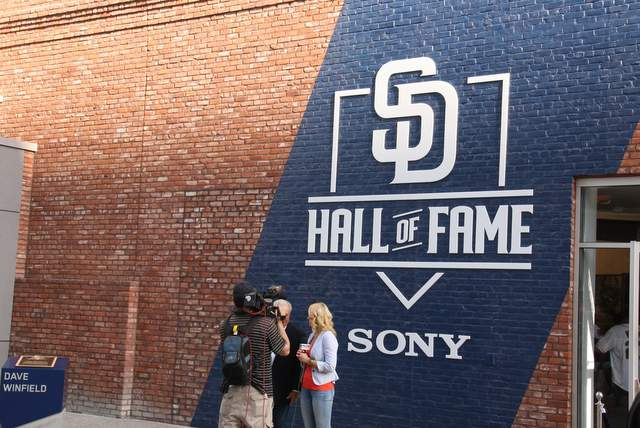
Opening of Padres Hall of Fame at Petco Park on July 1, 2016

The San Diego Padres are an American professional baseball team based in San Diego. The Padres compete in Major League Baseball (MLB). The club was founded in 1969 as part of the league's expansion. The team's hall of fame, created in 1999 to honor the club's 30th anniversary, recognizes players, coaches, and executives who have made key contributions to the franchise. Voting is conducted by a 35-member committee. Candidates typically must wait at least two years after retiring to be eligible for induction, though Tony Gwynn was selected during his final season in 2001 before the last game of the year. He was also the Hall of Fame's first ever unanimous selection. There are 19 members in the team's Hall of Fame, the most recent inductees being John Moores and Jake Peavy in 2023. The inductees are featured in an exhibit at the team's home stadium, Petco Park.

Cy Young Award winner Randy Jones, power-hitting first baseman Nate Colbert, and former owner Ray Kroc were elected to the founding class of the Padres Hall of Fame by a 24-panel committee that included 18 media members who had covered the Padres for at least seven years, four Padres representatives and one representative from the San Diego Baseball Historical Society and the Madres—a San Diego organization that promotes baseball. When Trevor Hoffman's induction was announced in 2014, Padres president Mike Dee stated that the hall's membership needed to be expanded "for those who may have not had [National Baseball] Hall of Fame careers like Trevor." Hoffman's induction was the first since manager Dick Williams' in 2009, as former club owners John Moores and Jeff Moorad had neglected the hall. New Padres ownership led by Ron Fowler placed a renewed organizational emphasis on the Hall of Fame, which included Hoffman's induction as well as future plans to relocate and redesign the hall's exhibit at Petco Park.

The exhibit opened on July 1, 2016, at Padres Hall of Fame Plaza, which is located near the left field entrance of the park at the back of the Western Metal Supply Company building. The new facilities were part of the festivities for the 2016 MLB All-Star Game, which was hosted at Petco Park. The plaza is a tribute to not only the history of the major league club, but also the history of baseball in San Diego, including the Padres from the Pacific Coast League (PCL). On the same day the plaza opened, the Padres inducted San Diego native Ted Williams into their hall of fame. He played for the PCL Padres in 1936 and 1937, and is also a member of the National Baseball Hall of Fame. The Hall of Fame Plaza at Petco originally was to be named in honor of then-MLB commissioner Bud Selig, but the Padres reconsidered after negative reaction from the media and fans. Plans for the plaza also included eventual statues of Padres greats.

== Inductees ==
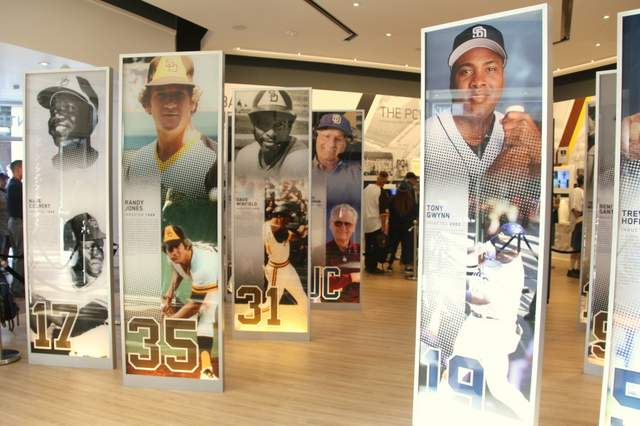
Portraits of inductees (from left to right) Nate Colbert, Randy Jones, Dave Winfield, Jerry Coleman, and Tony Gwynn

Inducted	Year officially inducted
Name	Name of inductee
Position	Player position or other role of inductee
Years	Years with the San Diego Padres
No.	Jersey number with Padres (players only)
*	Member of National Baseball Hall of Fame and Museum
^	Number retired by the Padres
†	Posthumously inducted

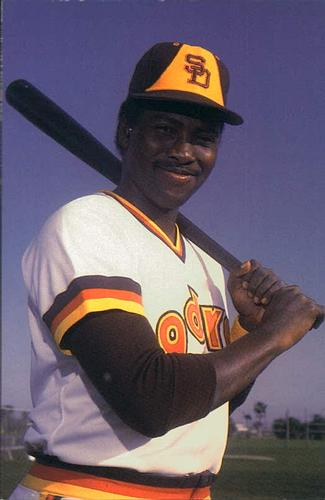
Tony Gwynn

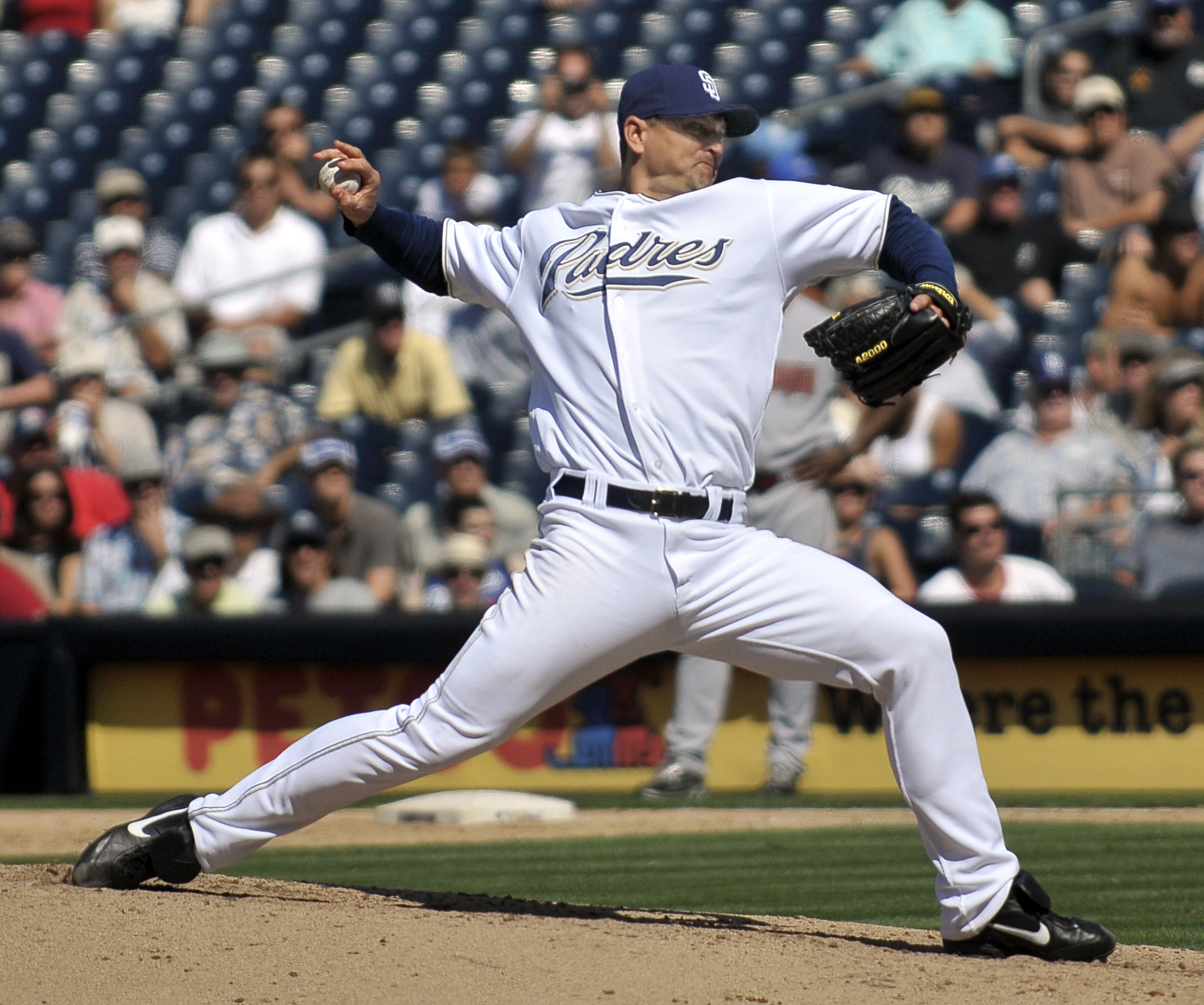
Trevor Hoffman

Inducted	Name	Position	Years	No.	Ref
1999	Randy Jones	Pitcher	1973–1980	35^	
1999	Nate Colbert	First baseman	1969–1974	17	
1999	Ray Kroc†	Owner	1974–1984	–	
2000	Dave Winfield*	Outfielder	1973–1980	31^	
2001	Buzzie Bavasi	President	1969–1977	–	
2001	Jerry Coleman	Announcer / Manager	1972–2013	2	
2002	Tony Gwynn*	Outfielder	1982–2001	19^	
2009	Dick Williams*	Manager	1982–1985	23	
2014	Trevor Hoffman*	Pitcher	1994–2008	51^	
2015	Benito Santiago	Catcher	1986-1992	9, 09	
2015	Garry Templeton	Shortstop	1982–1991	1	
2016	Ted Williams†*	Outfielder	1936–1937 (Note: Played for the minor league Padres in the PCL, never played for the major league Padres)	19	
2016	Ken Caminiti†	Third baseman	1995–1998	21	
2017	Jack McKeon	General manager / Manager	1980–1990	15	
2018	Kevin Towers†	General manager	1995–2009	—	
2022	Larry Lucchino	President / CEO	1995–2001	—	
2022	Ted Leitner	Broadcaster	1980–2020	—	
2023	Jake Peavy	Pitcher	2002–2009	44	
2023	John Moores	Owner	1994–2009	—	

== See also ==
- Breitbard Hall of Fame, San Diego sports hall of fame
