= Trevor Hoffman =

American baseball player (born 1967)

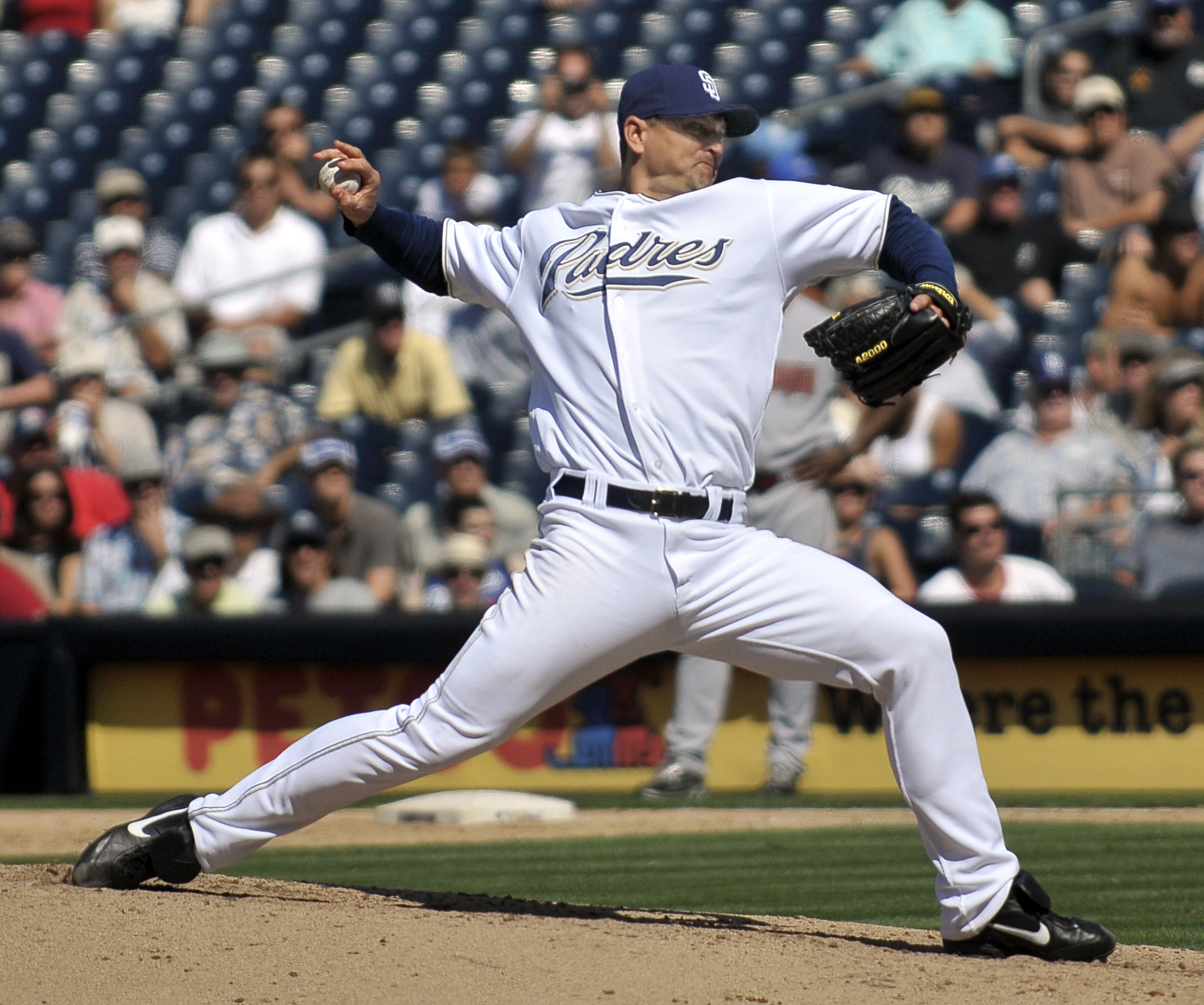
- Hoffman with the San Diego Padres in 2008
- Pitcher
- Born: October 13, 1967 (age 59); Bellflower, California, U.S.
- Batted: Right Threw: Right

MLB debut
- April 6, 1993, for the Florida Marlins

Last MLB appearance
- September 29, 2010, for the Milwaukee Brewers

MLB statistics
- Win–loss record: 61–75
- Earned run average: 2.87
- Strikeouts: 1,133
- Saves: 601
- Stats at Baseball Reference

Teams
- Florida Marlins (1993); San Diego Padres (1993–2008); Milwaukee Brewers (2009–2010)

Career highlights and awards
- 7× All-Star (1998–2000, 2002, 2006, 2007, 2009); 2× NL Rolaids Relief Man Award (1998, 2006); 2× NL saves leader (1998, 2006); San Diego Padres No. 51 retired; San Diego Padres Hall of Fame; Milwaukee Brewers Wall of Honor

Member of the National

Baseball Hall of Fame
- Induction: 2018
- Vote: 79.9% (third ballot)

Trevor William Hoffman (born October 13, 1967) is an American former professional baseball pitcher who played 18 years in Major League Baseball (MLB) from 1993 to 2010. A long-time closer, he pitched for the Florida Marlins, San Diego Padres, and Milwaukee Brewers, including more than 15 years for the Padres. Hoffman was the major leagues' first player to reach the 500- and 600-save milestones, and was the all-time saves leader from 2006 until 2011. The National League (NL) leader in career saves, he was inducted into the Baseball Hall of Fame in 2018. Hoffman currently serves as senior advisor for baseball operations for the Padres.

Hoffman played shortstop collegiately at the University of Arizona and was drafted in the 11th round by the Cincinnati Reds. After not having much success batting, he was converted to a pitcher, as he was able to throw up to 95 miles per hour (MPH). The Marlins acquired Hoffman in the 1992 expansion draft, and he pitched for Florida until he was traded to the Padres, mid-season in 1993, in a deal that sent star Gary Sheffield to the Marlins. Hoffman recorded 20 saves in 1994 in his first season as Padres closer, and in the following years, he became the face of the franchise after Tony Gwynn retired. Hoffman collected at least 30 saves each year for the next 14 years with San Diego, except for 2003 when he missed most of the year recovering from shoulder surgery. After the Padres did not re-sign him following the 2008 season, Hoffman pitched for two years with the Brewers before retiring after the 2010 season.

Hoffman was selected for the All-Star team seven times, and twice he was the runner-up for the NL Cy Young Award, given annually to the top pitcher in the league. Hoffman retired with MLB records of fifteen 20-save seasons, fourteen 30-save seasons (including eight consecutive), and nine 40-save seasons (including two streaks of four consecutive). He also retired with the highest career strikeout rate of any reliever. (Note: Minimum 1,000 innings pitched) Though Hoffman entered the majors with a powerful fastball, an injury after the 1994 season permanently diminished his fastball velocity and forced him to reinvent his pitching style; he subsequently developed one of the best changeups in baseball. Hoffman's entrance at home games accompanied by the AC/DC song "Hells Bells" was popular with fans.

After retiring as a player, Hoffman returned to the Padres as a special assistant in the front office. In 2014, he became the team's pitching coordinator at their upper minor league levels, which included working with the Padres general manager. The following year, Hoffman's role expanded to overseeing pitching instruction at all levels in the minors.

== Early life ==
Hoffman was born on October 13, 1967, in Bellflower, California. When he was six weeks old, Hoffman had to have a damaged kidney removed because an arterial blockage had formed there. His father, Ed, who stood at 6 feet 2 inches (1.88 m) and 225 pounds (102 kg), was a Marine and a veteran of the Battle of Iwo Jima in World War II. He later became a professional singer before he quit being on the road and got a job at the post office. He was also an usher at California Angels games; he was known as the Singing Usher, leading the crowd in the singing of "Take Me Out to the Ball Game" in the seventh-inning and filling in if the designated national anthem singer did not show up. Ed would often bring Trevor to the games with him. Hoffman's mother, Mikki, was an English-born ballerina and came from an athletic family. Her father, Jack French, was a professional soccer player with Southend United FC before World War II. She met Hoffman's father in a play in England in which she was performing and he was acting and singing. Hoffman was taught by his mom to take responsibility. "Bad workmen always blame their tools," Mikki would say.

Hoffman's older brother, Glenn, was nine years older and played shortstop in the Boston Red Sox organization. During summer vacation when Hoffman was 10 years old, he joined Glenn while he was playing in Pawtucket. His oldest brother, Greg, was 14 years Hoffman's senior and a mentor to his two younger brothers. After Hoffman's first Little League game, Greg asked him how he did. Hoffman said, "I went 2-for-4, double, RBI." Greg replied, "That'll be the last [blanking] time you tell me how you did. When I ask you how you did, it's how the team did." Hoffman never forgot that. Given their age difference, Hoffman considered his brothers more role models than playmates. "[Glenn] was the guide while Greg was the drill instructor", said Hoffman.

Because of his damaged kidney, Hoffman was not allowed to play football or wrestle. Hoffman went to Savanna High School in Anaheim, as had Glenn, and following his more-talented older brother put pressure on Hoffman. Ed, who did not trust that coaches would protect Hoffman's arm, stopped allowing his son to pitch after he was 12 years old. Standing at just 5 feet 6 inches (1.68 m) and 130 pounds (59 kg), Hoffman played shortstop at Savanna, but nobody offered him a scholarship out of high school. He grew three inches over the summer and continued playing at Cypress College, and later for the University of Arizona from 1988 through 1989. Arizona was afraid of the liability if Hoffman's remaining kidney got hit by a baseball. "I told them the one kidney I have is on my right side. That's not the side that faces the pitcher when I hit, so it was O.K. They bought it", said Hoffman. He led Arizona in hitting in 1988 with a .371 batting average, 35 points better than teammate J. T. Snow. Other notable teammates included Scott Erickson and Kevin Long. Hoffman exhibited a strong throwing arm playing shortstop.

== Professional playing career ==
=== Minor leagues ===
Hoffman was selected by the Cincinnati Reds in the 11th round with the 288th overall selection of the 1989 MLB draft, and he signed for $3,000. Prior to the draft, Reds scout Jeff Barton talked to Hoffman about playing another position. Hoffman was open to anything that might advance his career, and they talked about catching or pitching with his exceptional arm. Barton ranked Hoffman's arm an 80 on a 20–80 scale, where 60 was above average and 80 was a rarity. Hoffman played shortstop and third base for the Reds' Single-A affiliate Charleston. In his first 103 games, he only batted .212 with 23 runs batted in. Not showing much batting potential, Hoffman was converted to pitcher in 1991 at the suggestion of Charleston manager Jim Lett, who also grew tired of Hoffman overthrowing first base. Hoffman threw 95 miles per hour (153 km/h) and recorded a 2.90 ERA with 169 strikeouts in 142 2/3 minor league innings over two seasons while alternating between relieving and starting at Single-A Cedar Rapids, Double-A Chattanooga and Triple-A Nashville.

=== Major leagues (1993–2010) ===
==== 1993–1995 ====
Left unprotected by Cincinnati in the 1992 MLB Expansion Draft, Hoffman was selected by the Florida Marlins with the eighth pick in the first round. In his first major league season in 1993, Hoffman learned by observing Marlins closer Bryan Harvey's balanced demeanor. After earning two saves in 29 appearances with the Marlins as an unknown rookie, Hoffman was traded midseason to the San Diego Padres during San Diego's 1993 fire sale. The Padres sent third baseman Gary Sheffield and pitcher Rich Rodriguez to the Marlins for Hoffman and pitching prospects José Martínez and Andrés Berumen. Padres general manager Randy Smith said at the time, "The only way to acquire quality players is to give up quality." The year before, Sheffield had won the NL batting title and made a run at the Triple Crown. Smith insisted that Florida include Hoffman in the deal. Padres fans, upset at the trade, booed Hoffman during his first several appearances. He allowed three runs in his one-inning debut with San Diego, eight runs over his first three outings, and blew his first save opportunity as a Padre. He pitched 39 games for San Diego, who finished the season with 101 losses, and ended his rookie season with 79 strikeouts in 90 innings with a 3.90 ERA and five saves.

During the strike-shortened 1994 season, Hoffman took over closer duties from an injured and ineffective Gene Harris in mid-April. Hoffman recorded 20 saves and a 2.57 ERA while averaging 10.9 strikeouts per 9 innings pitched (K/9). The weekend after the strike began, Hoffman, playing Nerf football at Del Mar Beach near San Diego, dove for a pass and landed awkwardly on his right shoulder. He later played volleyball and landed on the shoulder again while going for a dig. He heard a strange sound.

In 1995, he had a 3.88 ERA and 31 saves and averaged 8.8 K/9. Hoffman pitched hurt from spring training through the season and finally had off-season rotator cuff surgery. "[Hoffman] never bitched about his arm, which was killing him from Day One ... He was out there when most guys wouldn't have been", said Smith. This is also the year during which he developed his changeup.

==== 1996–1998 ====
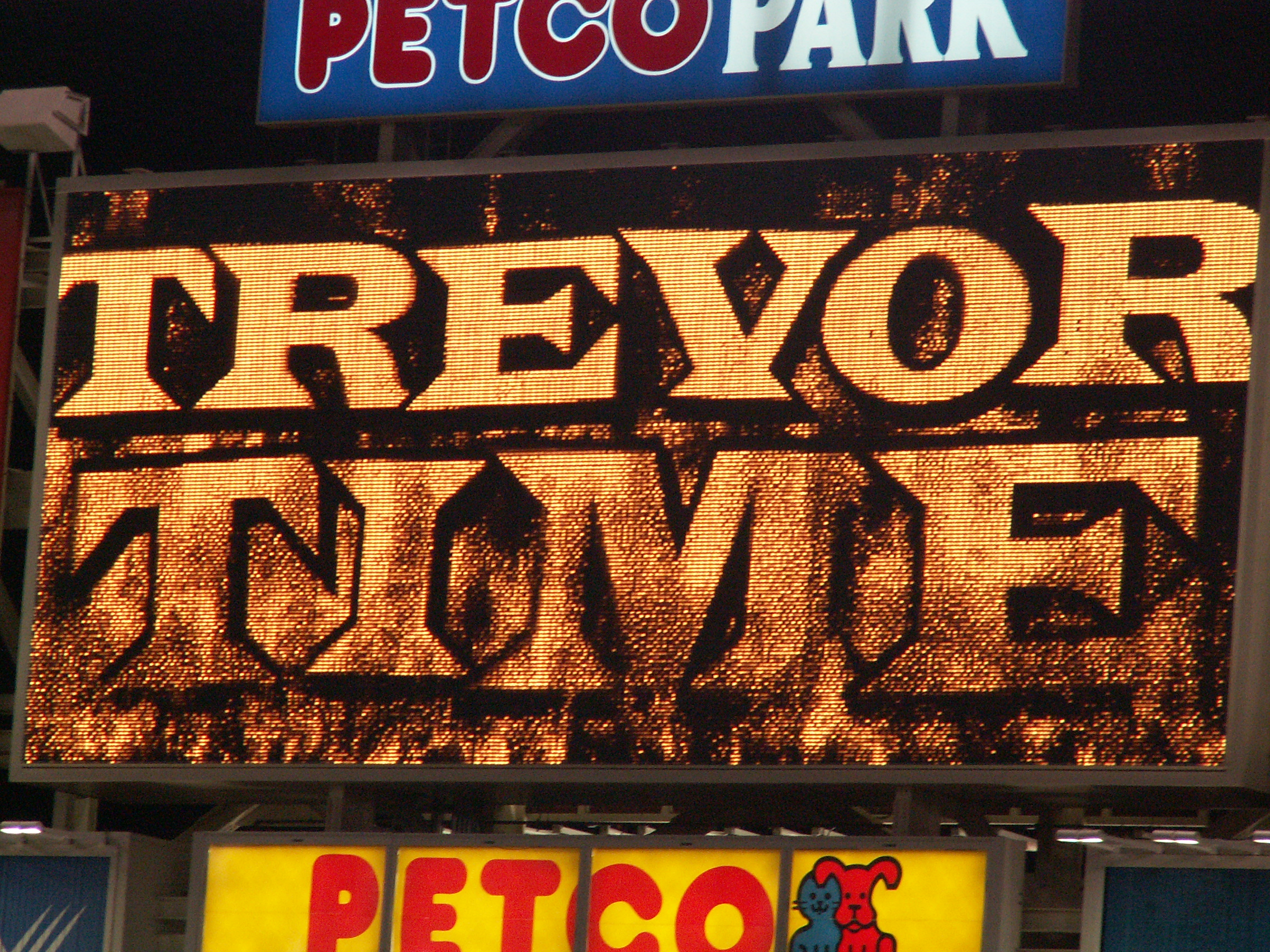
Petco Park's introduction for Hoffman's entrance during his tenure with the Padres.

In both 1996 and 1997, Hoffman pitched over 80 innings, with 111 strikeouts, averaged approximately 40 saves, and had ERAs of 2.25 and 2.66. In 1996, the Padres entered the last three games of the season in Los Angeles trailing the division-leading Dodgers by two games. Hoffman recorded saves in each of the final three games against the Dodgers, as the Padres won the NL West for their first division title in 12 years. After finishing the season with 18 straight saves, Hoffman was named The Sporting News NL Fireman of the Year in 1996, and received votes for both the Cy Young Award and the NL Most Valuable Player (MVP) Award. The Padres played the St. Louis Cardinals in the 1996 National League Division Series (NLDS) and were swept in the series 3–0. Hoffman entered Game 2 with the score tied and one out and inherited runners on second and third. A run scored as he retired the only two batters he faced, and the Padres lost 5–4. In Game 3, Hoffman recorded the loss as he came into the tie game and allowed a 2-run homer to Brian Jordan for a 7–5 loss. The following season on June 23, 1997, he came in with the bases loaded in the ninth inning and struck out J. T. Snow to save the 11–6 win over the San Francisco Giants and became the Padres' career saves leader with 109, passing Hall of Famer Rollie Fingers. San Diego won only 76 games that year, but Hoffman ranked second in the NL with 37 saves.

During the 1998 season, Hoffman began entering save situations in Padres home games to the entrance music of AC/DC's "Hells Bells" playing over the public address system, an event that came to be known as "Trevor Time". The tradition began July 25, 1998, and the song was chosen by a Padres salesman. The crowd was excited by the tolling of the bells from the song, and the scoreboard showing Hoffman running in from the bullpen. Hoffman preserved a 6–5 win against the Houston Astros by striking out Moisés Alou to end that game and converted his 41st consecutive save opportunity, tying an MLB record at the time. The following night, Hoffman's streak ended on an Alou home run, though the Padres ended up winning the game. It was Hoffman's only blown save of the regular season. On September 1, he saved a 9–8 victory over the New York Mets for his 45th save, breaking the club record set by Mark Davis in 1989 when he won the Cy Young Award. On September 12, the Padres clinched their second division title in three years after Hoffman saved an 8–7 win over the Dodgers. In a 4–3 win over the Chicago Cubs on September 14, he worked a perfect ninth inning and became the fourth reliever in MLB history to reach the 50-save mark. Hoffman had a career-high 53 saves and a career-best 1.48 ERA. His saves tied the NL single-season record set in 1993 by the Cubs' Randy Myers. Opponents batted .165 against him, and the first hitters he faced hit .129. His ERA in save situations was 0.49, and he struck out 10.6 hitters per nine innings. The Padres were 62–4 in games he pitched. Hoffman was runner-up in the Cy Young Award race that year to Tom Glavine of the Atlanta Braves, despite receiving 13 first-place votes to Glavine's 11. Hoffman was left off of six ballots. Hoffman and Adam Wainwright in 2009 are the only two pitchers to ever receive the most first-place votes and not win the Cy Young. Hoffman won the Rolaids Relief Man of the Year Award and captured another Fireman of the Year Award. He finished seventh in NL MVP voting.

Facing the Houston Astros in the 1998 NLDS, the Padres won the series 3–1. Hoffman earned two saves, both in 2–1 wins. In Game 1 against Atlanta in the 1998 National League Championship Series, Hoffman entered to stop a rally in the eighth inning with a 2–1 lead. He allowed a run in the ninth, tying the game, after converting 53 of 54 save attempts during the regular season. After Padre Ken Caminiti hit a home run in the top of the 10th, Hoffman got two outs but ran into trouble and was taken out after throwing 43 pitches. He was credited with a win as the Padres held on, 3–2. Hoffman entered Game 3 with the bases loaded and two out in the eighth, and he struck out Javy López on three pitches to end the inning and would save the Padres' 4–1 victory. San Diego was up 3–0 in the series and would go on to win 4–2. The Padres reached the 1998 World Series, but lost the series 4–0 against the New York Yankees, who finished with an MLB-record 125 combined regular season and playoff victories and the third-best overall winning percentage (.714) for a World Series champion. In his only appearance in the series in Game 3, Hoffman entered in the eighth with a runner on and no outs and a 3–2 lead. Later in the inning, he surrendered a three-run homer to Scott Brosius, the eventual World Series MVP, and the Padres lost the game 5–4.

==== 1999–2002 ====
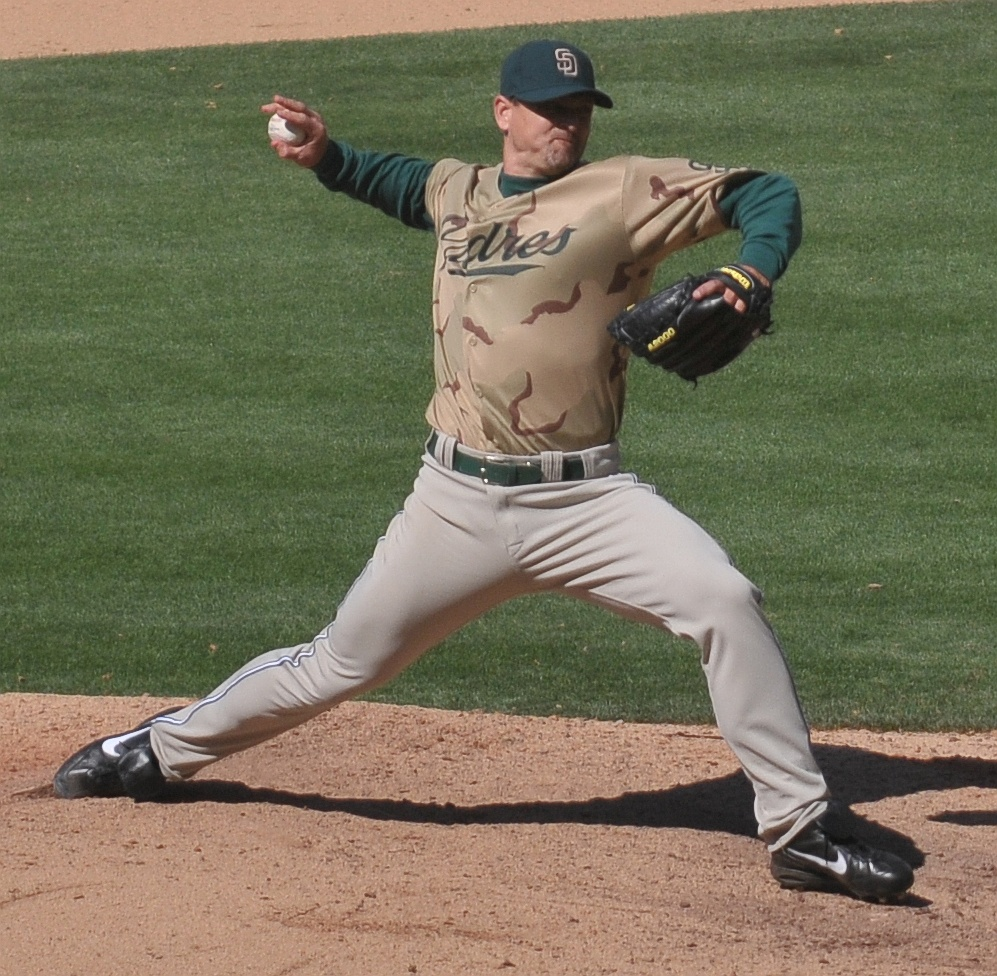
Hoffman in 2002

Hoffman signed a $32 million contract extension with San Diego in March 1999 for the 2000–03 seasons. At the time, it was the richest contract ever given any Padre or any relief pitcher. The Padres held an option for $10 million for 2004. Hoffman's contract included a no-trade clause, the first the Padres had ever granted. Following their World Series appearance in 1998, the Padres lost key players to begin the 1999 season and finished under .500 each season from 1999 through 2002, while finishing either fourth or fifth in the five-team NL West each year. Hoffman saved 56% of the team's wins during that span. He set MLB records with his fifth overall and fourth consecutive 40-save season in 2001, as well as his seventh consecutive 30-save campaign. In 2002, he extended his MLB record with his eighth straight 30-save season. Hoffman was named to the All-Star game in 1999, 2000, and 2002. On June 10, 1999, Hoffman struck out the side in the ninth inning in a 2–1 Padres victory over the Oakland Athletics for his 200th career save. On August 15, 2001, Hoffman recorded his 300th save in a 2–1 home win over the Mets. He became the face of the Padres franchise after right fielder Tony Gwynn retired at the conclusion of the 2001 season. Hoffman broke Dennis Eckersley's record for most saves with one team (320) in 2002. Sports Illustrated placed Hoffman on the cover of their May 13, 2002, issue with the headline "The Secret of San Diego: Why Trevor Hoffman of the Padres is the best closer (ever)".

==== 2003–2006 ====
Hoffman sat out most of the 2003 season while recovering from two offseason shoulder surgeries, including one that trimmed the tip of his scapula. It marked the first time he had been on the disabled list after 10 major league seasons. In his absence, Rod Beck closed for the Padres. Hoffman pitched his first game in 2003 on September 2 with a perfect seventh inning in a 6–3 win over the Arizona Diamondbacks. He pitched in nine games in 2003, all non-save situations, with an ERA of 2.00 and 11 strikeouts in 9 innings. Coming off the injury, the Padres bought out their $10 million option on Hoffman for 2004 for $2 million and agreed to a new deal with a $2.5 million salary for 2004 including $500,000 in incentives and an option for 2005. In the Padres inaugural season at their new home in Petco Park in 2004, Hoffman returned to the closer role and finished with 41 saves with a 2.30 ERA, his lowest since 1998. He passed Jeff Reardon (367) and Hall of Famer Dennis Eckersley (390) to end the season third on the all-time saves list. The new park provided an upgrade over Qualcomm Stadium for "Trevor Time" with a state-of-the-art sound system and new scoreboards with enhanced visuals allowing for animated flames and live fan shots.

On May 6, 2005, Hoffman saved a 6–5 win over the St. Louis Cardinals as the Padres won two straight in St. Louis for the first time since 1977. It was Hoffman's 400th save, and he became the third pitcher in MLB history to reach the milestone, following John Franco (424) and Lee Smith (478). Hoffman was named both the NL Pitcher of the Month and Delivery Man of the Month in May after a perfect 12 for 12 in save opportunities while posting a 0.82 ERA (1 ER/11.0 IP) in 12 games as the Padres went 22–6 for their best month in franchise history. On August 24, Hoffman converted his 29th consecutive save opportunity in a 7–4 win over the Houston Astros. He passed Franco for second place on the all-time saves list with his 425th save, and the Padres maintained a six-game lead in the NL West with a 63–63 record. The Padres won the NL West with an 82–80 record, and Hoffman finished the season 43 for 46 in save opportunities, the second most saves in the NL. The Padres were swept 3–0 in the playoffs by the Cardinals, who had a majors-best 100–62 record in the regular season. Hoffman did not get into any save situations as the Padres never led through any of the 27 innings in the series.

As a free agent after the 2005 season, Hoffman re-signed with the Padres after negotiating with the Cleveland Indians. Hoffman signed a $13.5 million, two-year contract that included a club option for 2008. "It came down to me making a decision for my family and not disrupting what we have going on", said Hoffman. "This is probably the most significant signing that I've had", said then-Padres general manager Kevin Towers. "This guy is the face of our organization. I can't put into words what he means to our community."

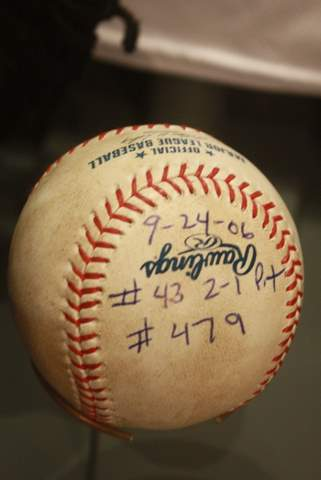
Baseball from Hoffman's then-record 479th save.

In 2006, Hoffman was named to his fifth All-Star game, but was the losing pitcher in the game after having two strikes with two outs to Michael Young, who was later named the All-Star Game Most Valuable Player. His All-Star performance bothered him, and he suffered two of his five blown saves that year in the week that followed. August 20 marked Hoffman's 776th outing for the Padres, breaking the major league record set by Elroy Face of the Pittsburgh Pirates for most relief appearances with one club. On September 24 in the Padres' last home game of the year, Hoffman retired eventual 2006 NL batting champion Freddy Sanchez for the final out of a 2–1 win over the Pirates, keeping the Padres 1 1/2-game lead atop the NL West with seven games left to play. With the save, Hoffman became the all-time Major League saves leader, surpassing Lee Smith's record of 478. As the Padres celebrated on the mound with Hoffman, the Pirates remained in the dugout watching in respectful salute. "I've never seen a crowd get into one inning for one guy like that before", said Pirates reliever John Grabow. "You get goose bumps even if you are on the other team." The Padres presented Hoffman with a golden bell trophy, a reference to "Hells Bells".

Hoffman saved a 3–1 win over the Diamondbacks on September 30 as the Padres to clinched a playoff berth. The next day in the last regular season game, two home runs were hit off Hoffman before he saved a 7–6 win over the Diamondbacks, earning the Padres their second consecutive NL West title. He was named Delivery Man of the Month for September after being 10 for 11 in save opportunities and striking out 13 batters over 12.0 innings and allowing only seven hits. Hoffman saved 46 of 51 save chances on the year, and led the NL in saves for the second time. His 11th 30-save season set an MLB record, while his eighth 40-save season extended his record. His season save total was the second highest in his career. Hoffman won the Rolaids Relief Award for the second time in his career, was awarded The Sporting News NL Reliever of the Year for the third time, and finished as the runner-up for the Cy Young Award for the second time. In the playoffs, the Padres faced the Cardinals in the NLDS again. Down 2–0 in the series, Hoffman saved Game 3 in a 3–1 win to avoid elimination. However, the Padres lost the series 3–1 as their offense managed only six runs in the four games against the eventual 2006 World Series champions.

==== 2007–2008 ====
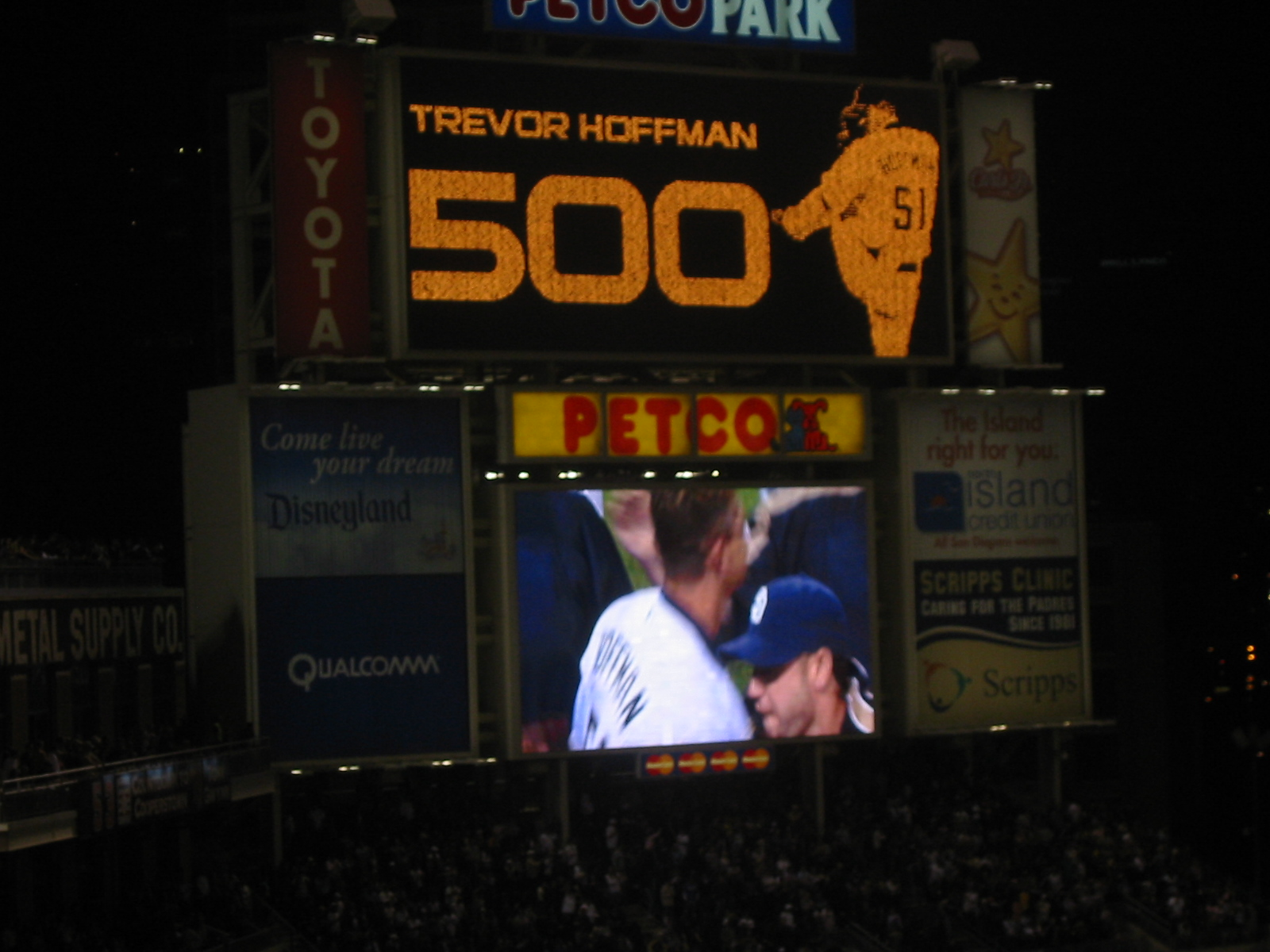
Hoffman was first major leaguer to reach 500 saves.

On April 28, 2007, in a 3–2 win over the Dodgers, Hoffman earned a save and pitched in his 803rd game for the Padres, breaking the MLB record for games pitched for one team. The record was previously held by both Walter Johnson of the Washington Senators and Elroy Face of the Pirates. On June 6 against the Dodgers, Hoffman became the first pitcher in MLB history to log 500 saves after the Padres' 5–2 victory. Hoffman was awarded the Delivery Man of the Month for May after converting all 11 of his save opportunities and allowing no earned runs in 13 games. On July 1, Hoffman was named to the NL All-Star Team for the sixth time in his career. On September 8 against the Colorado Rockies, Hoffman struck-out Todd Helton swinging on a 74-mph change-up for his 1,000th career strikeout, becoming the eighth reliever to reach the mark. On September 27, Hoffman picked up his 40th save of the 2007 season, marking his ninth season with 40 saves, a Major League record. On September 29, one strike away from clinching the Padres third consecutive playoff berth, Hoffman surrendered a tying, two-out triple in the ninth inning to Tony Gwynn Jr., son of legendary Padres Hall of Famer Tony Gwynn. The Padres would lose 4–3 in the 11th inning to the Milwaukee Brewers. On October 1, in the Padres' wild card tie-breaker game against the Rockies, Hoffman blew his second straight save opportunity and his team's 8–6 lead in the 13th inning. He took the loss when he allowed the game-winning run to score on a sacrifice fly. For the season, he converted 42 saves in 49 opportunities while posting a 4–5 mark and 2.98 ERA. His 42 saves were the third most in the NL. A couple of weeks after the end of the season, Hoffman had minor arthroscopic surgery on his pitching elbow to remove bone chips. He said it was unrelated to his pitching performance at the end of the season.

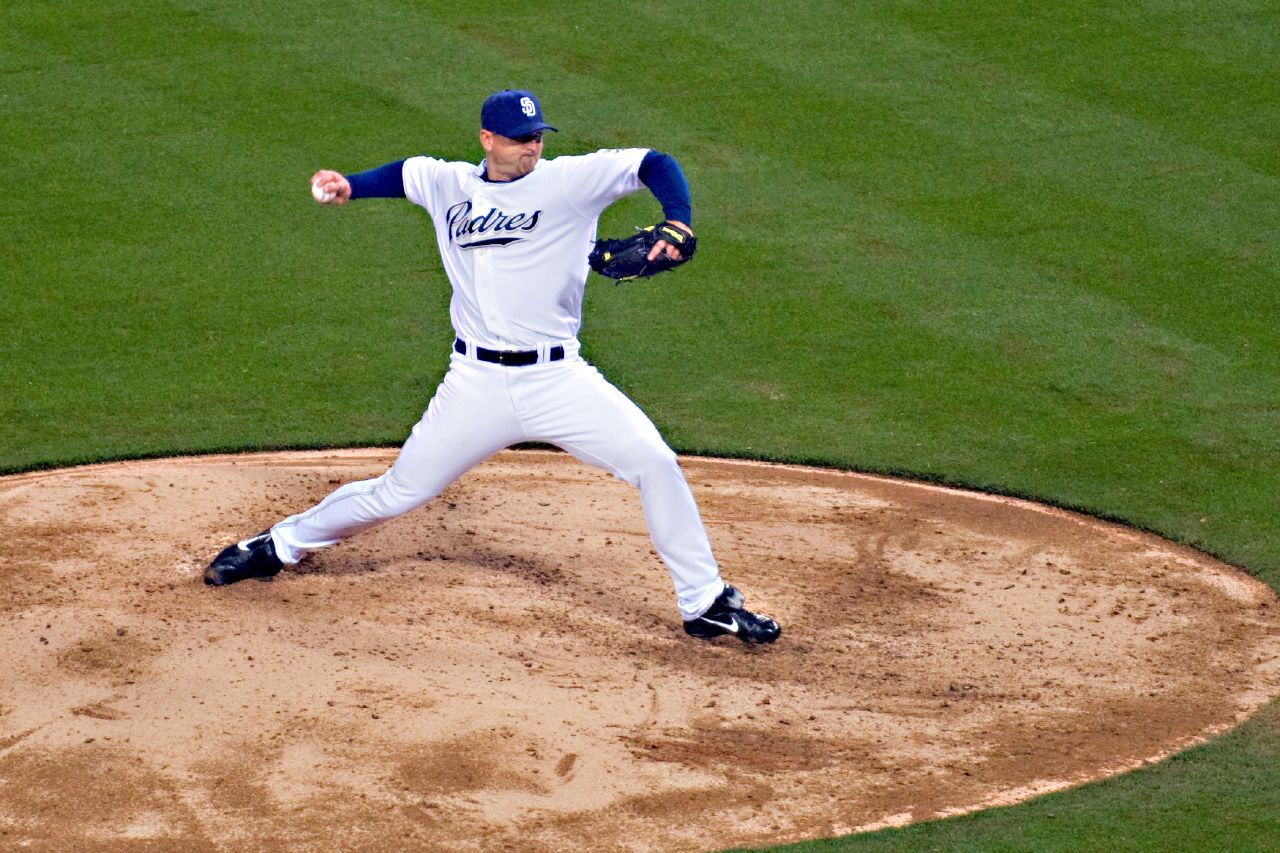
Hoffman pitching in June 2008

Hoffman surrendered a home run but recorded his 550th save on August 14, 2008, in a 3–2 victory over the Brewers. On September 19, 2008, Hoffman finished an 11–6 14-inning win over the Washington Nationals for his 900th career MLB game. Hoffman's 30th and last save of the season, a 3–2 win over the Pirates, ensured the Padres would not lose 100 games that season. The Padres finished with a 63–99 record after being projected by the team and analysts to win 87–90 games. Hoffman ended the 2008 season 3–6 with a 3.77 ERA and 30 in 34 save opportunities. He tied for sixth in the NL in saves. Hoffman reached 20 or more saves for the 14th time to set a new MLB record. He had a 5.14 ERA through his first 29 appearances and a 1.56 ERA in his last 19 appearances of the season.

Hoffman, eligible for free agency, realized he was decreasing his leverage when he declared he wanted to return to play for San Diego in 2009 and did not want to move his family. Meanwhile, Padres owner John Moores, who was in the midst of a divorce and in the process of selling the team, ordered the team to reduce its payroll from its 2008 budget of $73.6 million to $40 million. It was announced on November 10, 2008, that Hoffman would not return to San Diego in 2009. With his struggles during the season, the cost-cutting Padres lowballed a $4 million offer with an option for 2010 and later retracted that, ending his tenure with the team. It was not an amicable parting for Hoffman, who was the face of the franchise after Tony Gwynn's retirement following the 2001 season. His 902 career appearances as a Padre extended his own MLB record for games pitched with one team.

==== 2009–2010 ====
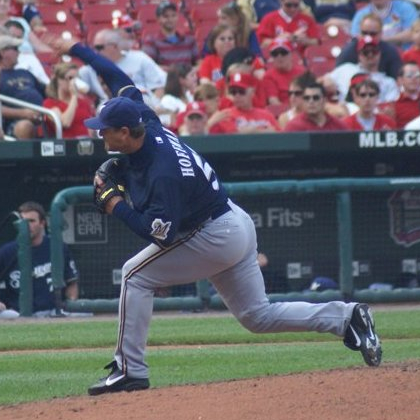
Hoffman in his first season with the Brewers in 2009

On January 13, 2009, Hoffman signed a one-year, $6 million deal with the Milwaukee Brewers. He suffered a strained muscle on the right side of his rib cage in spring training, and started the season on the DL. He made his Brewers debut on April 27, 2009. Hoffman recorded his first save for Milwaukee the next day, and the Brewers continued with his "Trevor Time" entrance. He was named NL Pitcher of the Month as well as Delivery Man of the Month in May after recording 11 saves in 12 scoreless appearances in the month. He started the season with 18 scoreless innings before entering in a tie game on June 14 and surrendering a run in a 5–4 loss against the Chicago White Sox.

Hoffman was selected as an All-Star in 2009 as a late replacement, making his seventh appearance. (Note: Replaced Jonathan Broxton) On September 3, he struck out Albert Pujols on three pitches for his 30th save in the 4–3 win over St. Louis. The save extended Hoffman's record to 14 seasons with at least 30 saves. He had already increased his record of 20 or more saves to 15. Hoffman appeared in 55 games with the Brewers, recording 37 saves in 41 attempts with a 1.83 ERA and a .183 BAA. It was the second lowest ERA of his career behind his 1.48 ERA in 1998, and he ranked fifth in the NL in saves. In the offseason, he re-signed with the Brewers for $8 million for 2010 with a mutual option for the 2011 season.

With less control on his changeup, Hoffman struggled in 2010. In April, Hoffman pitched nine innings and allowed 13 earned runs and six home runs—surpassing his totals in both categories from all of the previous season—and he blew four of his seven save opportunities. Historically though, Hoffman had blown 20 of 84 save attempts in April for his career, a 76.1 percent success rate, while converting 90.6 percent the rest of the season. On May 1, Hoffman earned his first save at Petco Park as a visitor, as the Brewers beat the Padres 2–1. After saving just five of his first 10 chances with an ERA over 12.00 in mid-May, Hoffman's struggles prompted Brewers manager Ken Macha to remove him as closer and move him into middle relief to work on his mechanics. Hoffman insisted that there was nothing physically wrong with him, and he served as a mentor for his replacement, John Axford. Stuck at 596 career saves before his demotion, Hoffman eventually returned to a setup role, and occasionally pitched in save situations. On September 7, 2010, he recorded his 600th save, and he was carried off the field by his teammates. "To be a part of it was great because of how much admiration we all have for Trevor", said teammate Craig Counsell. Hoffman finished the season win a 2–7 win–loss record, 10 saves in 15 chances, and a 5.89 ERA in 50 appearances, but he allowed just nine earned runs in his final 33 appearances dating back to June 3. He and the Brewers parted ways on November 2 when the club declined to exercise a $7 million mutual option on his contract.

==== Retirement ====
In the offseason, Hoffman expressed interest in taking over the closer role for a team near his home in San Diego, but he did not wish to return as a setup pitcher and diminish his accomplishments. The Arizona Diamondbacks, where old friend and former Padres general manager Kevin Towers was the GM, considered Hoffman a backup option as their closer had they not managed to sign J. J. Putz. Hoffman believed he could still pitch in the big leagues, but with all of the closer roles for West Coast teams filled, he elected to retire, announcing his decision on January 11, 2011. He revealed that elbow tendinitis plagued him for most of the first half of 2010, though he never used it as an excuse for his performance. Hoffman had received three cortisone injections that year with the Brewers. Hoffman retired with 601 saves as the all-time saves leader in MLB history. He had no desire to sign a ceremonial one-day player contract to retire as a Padre. "I don't believe that's the right way [to retire]", said Hoffman.

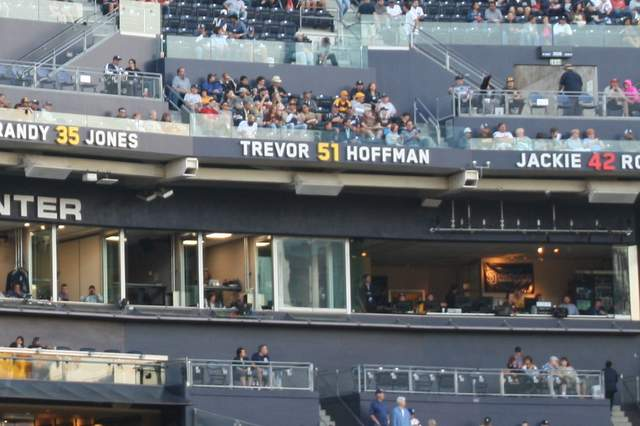
Hoffman's No. 51 is displayed with other Padres retired numbers in the Ring of Honor at Petco Park

The Padres retired Hoffman's No. 51 at Petco Park in a pre-game ceremony on August 21, 2011, against the Florida Marlins. San Diego Mayor Jerry Sanders declared it "Trevor Hoffman Day." The ceremony was patterned after the show This Is Your Life, featuring over 40 of Hoffman's former teammates and coaches. Brian Johnson, the lead singer on AC/DC's "Hells Bells", paid tribute in a video to Hoffman for "rocking the mound." In a nod to Hoffman's late father, Ed, the Padres presented Hoffman with a mint condition 1958 Cadillac convertible; his father loved driving his family in a convertible. For the National Anthem, the Padres played a video of Ed singing "The Star-Spangled Banner" at Fenway Park on Opening Day in 1981 when Hoffman's brother, Glenn, was the starting shortstop for the Red Sox.

In 2014, Hoffman became the ninth inductee into the San Diego Padres Hall of Fame. He became eligible for induction into the National Baseball Hall of Fame starting in 2016. In his debut, he fell short of the 75 percent of votes required for entry, but the 67.3 percent he received as a first-year candidate was promising for induction in the future. In 2017, Hoffman received 74 percent of the vote, falling five votes short of induction. On January 24, 2018, Hoffman was elected into the Baseball Hall of Fame with 79.9 percent of the vote. Soon thereafter, the Padres announced plans to unveil a bronze statue of Hoffman at Petco Park sometime around his July 29 induction into the Hall of Fame.

== Player profile ==
=== Pitching style ===
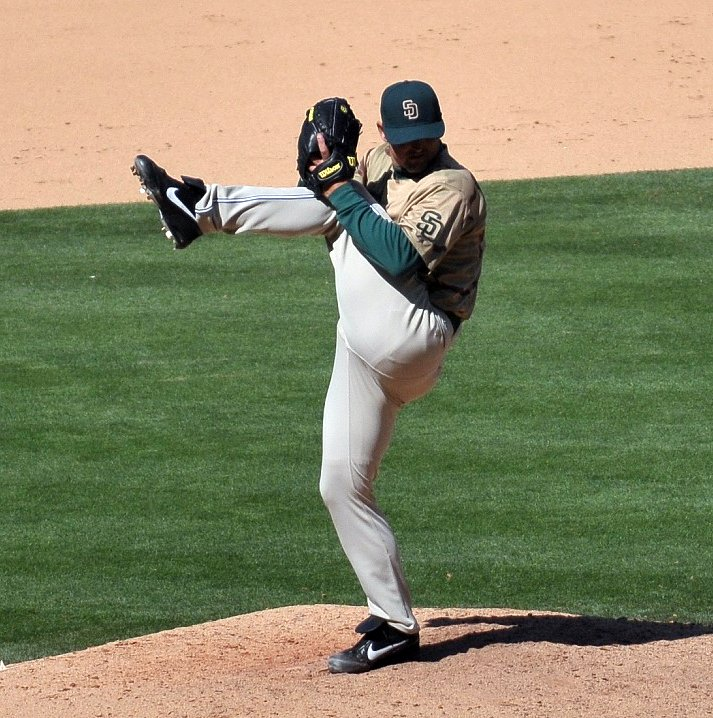
Hoffman with his trademark leg kick

Hoffman was known for his high leg kick, the menacing glare through his cap pulled down almost to his eyes, and his deceptive changeup. When Hoffman first came into the league, he could throw up to 95 mph. He would also throw a slider and only an occasional changeup. His original changeup was a conventional circle changeup taught to him by Cincinnati scout Larry Barton. Hoffman learned a different changeup, which he threw with a palmball grip, from teammate Donnie Elliott in 1994. He began using the new changeup in 1995 when his fastball had dropped to 88–90 mph after his offseason injury on the beach. With the decrease in velocity, Hoffman knew he could not rely as much on his fastball. He played through 1995 and had surgery the following offseason for a torn rotator cuff. When he returned the following year, Hoffman's fastball was at 87–88 mph, but he had more experience with his new changeup. His fastball reached back as high as 91 mph in 1998, but by sometime after 2000 it dropped down to 83–88 mph. His repertoire by then included primarily of his changeup, a four-seam fastball, a slower cut fastball that moves in towards a left-handed batter, and the occasional slider and a curveball.

Hoffman explained the key to his changeup was how he pinched the seam of the ball with his thumb and index finger as he released it. He threw the changeup with the arm speed used to throw a fastball, and the spin and movement of the ball looked the same to the batter. His changeup ranged from 73 to 76 mph. Bruce Bochy, who managed Hoffman for over a decade with the Padres, said of Hoffman's changeup: "He pitched so well off his fastball [opponents] couldn't just sit on it every pitch." "You could be sitting on [his changeup] and still not be successful with it", says former player Mark Sweeney. It was the arm action on the change up and the late sink just before it reached the plate that allowed Hoffman to stay successful over the years. With opponents flailing to slow down their swings, teammates nicknamed Hoffman's changeup The Bugs Bunny Pitch after a famous Bugs Bunny cartoon episode. "Some [pitchers] fool you. Some guys overpower you. Hoffman embarrasses you", said former rival and later teammate Mike Piazza. After striking out on a changeup to end the game against Hoffman, Dodger catcher Paul Lo Duca said, "It's like it has a parachute on it." As Hoffman lost velocity on his fastball throughout his career, he compensated by maintaining a notable speed differential between that pitch and his changeup. He initially kept the grip of his changeup a secret. "I was a little weird about it", Hoffman said. "I didn't like talking about how I threw the change. I didn't want people to see how I gripped the ball. I thought I'd be giving away something to the hitters." Later in his career, he posed for pictures of his grip, figuring everyone had seen it.

=== Work ethic ===
Padres general manager Kevin Towers said Hoffman was the first one in and the last one out of the ballpark every day. Hoffman adhered to a daily conditioning program. When pitcher Jeremy Fikac was promoted to the majors in 2001, Hoffman invited him to join him on his usual afternoon run. "I remember sitting in the bullpen that night, and my legs were still trembling from the run", Fikac recalled. "I'd run before, but not at that pace ... I was thinking, I hope they don't call on me because I can't feel my legs under me ... His work ethic is unbelievable." Bochy said, "[Hoffman's] one of those guys like Tony Gwynn—they never feel like they've arrived. Tony never thought, 'Well, I'm hitting .360 ... ' He was never content. And Trevor's the same way. They just keep working and make sure that they've got goals they want to reach." After every save opportunity, whether he converted it or blew it, Hoffman would sit in the dugout for up to five minutes after his teammates had cleared out. Whether it was the euphoria from success or the sting of failure, he would sit there and drain all the emotion out of himself, put the game behind him, and move on. Tracy Hoffman said, "He's all about order. That's the foundation to what he does. You see it when he's on the field. He's always the same, win or lose. He doesn't smile, doesn't show any emotion." Padres manager Bud Black marveled at Hoffman's regimen. "The daily preparation for his job, that focus and dedication each day to prepare for the ninth inning ... It was incredible to see live", said Black. "I played with George Brett, a Hall of Famer who was a great worker. But Trevor took it to a level and a commitment and Hall of Fame caliber." After Hoffman resurrected his final season and recorded his 600th save, Macha said Hoffman's "work ethic and perseverance paid off ... He had to grind it out to get there."

=== Character ===
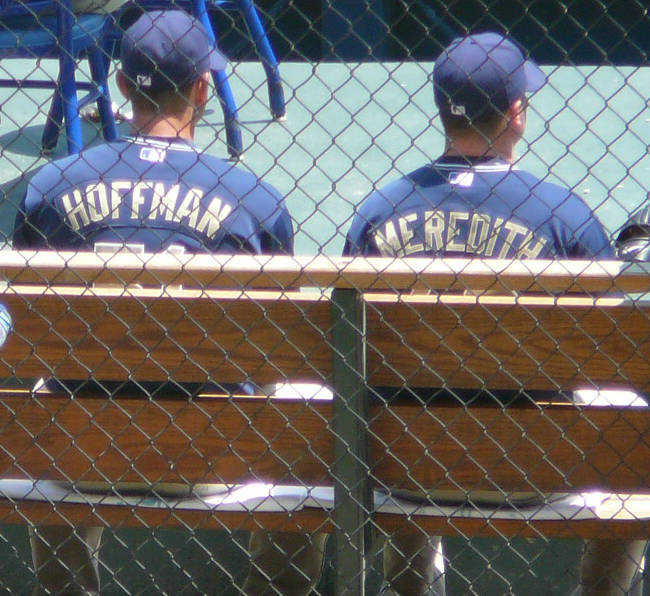
Hoffman with teammate Cla Meredith

Hoffman was long regarded as one of the great teammates in baseball. He was known as a leader in the clubhouse and a tutor to younger players. He mentored his successor in San Diego, Heath Bell, and the pitcher who supplanted him in Milwaukee, John Axford. "Just watching him go about his business was a big thing to me", Bell said. In his first game pitching setup to Axford after losing his closer role, Hoffman stayed in the dugout to watch Axford finish. Many relievers retire back to the clubhouse after being removed from a game. Hoffman's teammates noticed that he stayed supporting Axford through a bases-loaded jam. Axford spent the season absorbing Hoffman's advice, and the two bonded. "He took young players under his wing, especially relief pitchers", said former Padres teammate Brad Ausmus. Hoffman regularly organized team dinners on the road or had team family gatherings at his home, whether it was with the Padres or the Brewers. "It's very unusual for a pitcher, especially a relief pitcher, to be the team leader", Padres first baseman Phil Nevin said in 2002, "but everybody here looks to Trevor. This is his team."

According to Ausmus, Hoffman wanted his teams to feel like a family. He felt like he let his family down if he did not do his job on a particular night. Still, he was accessible and held himself accountable on the rare occasions that he failed. Hoffman was more accommodating for interviews after blown saves than he was after successful ones. "The people asking the questions are not responsible for the ball flying out of the park", he explained. Both Towers and Black best remember Hoffman for his accountability after his blown save in the 2007 Wild Card tie-breaker.

"My greatest memory of Trevor is from game No. 163 in 2007. Seeing his passion for the Padres, his love for his teammates, and his devastation over the loss and then handling each reporter's question with the utmost class and professionalism ranks as my greatest sports memory. How he handled that incredible loss says more about him than any save could. Life is about how you handle adversity and what he demonstrated that night was just remarkable.

— Warren Miller, Padres media relations director

Baseball people revere Hoffman for how he treats people. Ausmus says Hoffman goes out of his way to engage fans. Beyond shaking hands or signing autographs, he has extended conversations with fans who want to talk baseball. When Hoffman passed on the Indians in free agency to stay with the Padres, he still sent an autographed jersey as a baby gift to then-Indians manager Eric Wedge. After Hoffman saved the game to clinch the NL West on the last day of the 1996 season, he called Randy Smith, who traded for Hoffman as Padre GM before moving on to the Detroit Tigers. "Randy, I wish you were here", Hoffman said. "You're a part of this." While celebrating his record setting 479th save against the Pirates, Hoffman tipped his cap to the Pittsburgh dugout, particularly Pirates manager Jim Tracy, who managed Hoffman in Cincinnati's Double-A Chattanooga farm team in 1991 after he was converted to a pitcher. Despite losing his role as a closer in his final season, Hoffman took pleasure in supporting his teammates and "not being a cancer just because I was having trouble."

== Legacy ==
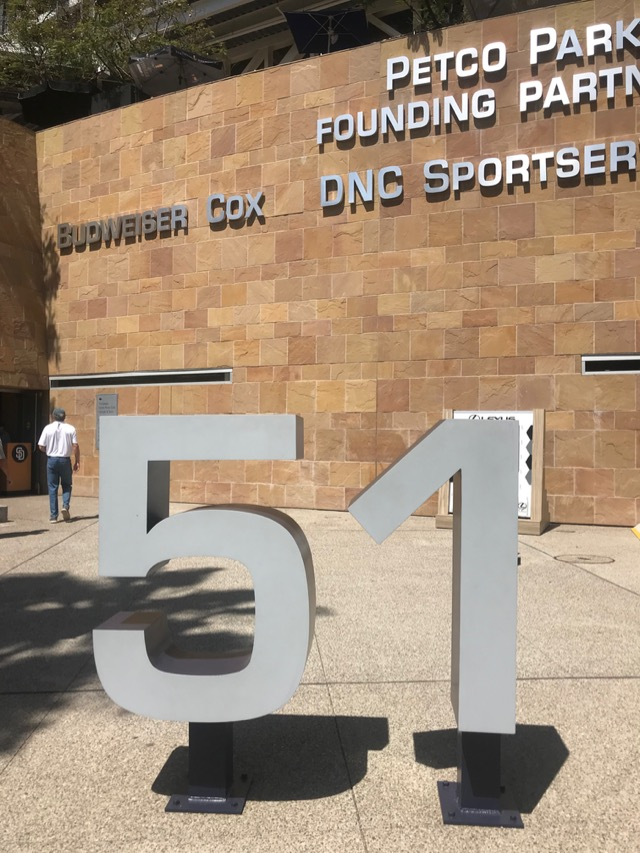
Hoffman's retired No. 51 honored at Home Plate Plaza at Petco Park

The NL leader in career saves, Hoffman dominated his position at a consistent level while enjoying incredible longevity over almost two decades. After an 18-year career, the seven-time NL All-Star retired as MLB's all-time leader in saves with 601. He was the first pitcher to reach not only the 500 save milestone, but also 600. He converted 88.8 percent of his save opportunities, the third-highest rate among players with 300 or more saves. Barry Bloom of MLB.com called Hoffman "the best National League closer of his era." Hoffman is one of only three pitchers who have had streaks of four straight seasons with at least 40 saves; (Note: Francisco Rodríguez and Craig Kimbrel are the others) he achieved it twice. His nine seasons of 40 or more saves are tied for the most all-time. He became one of the Padres' most-popular players. His 15-year stint as their closer was rare for a baseball role that exhibited a high turnover rate.

Hoffman had 12 seasons with at least 37 saves, 13 seasons with a sub-3.00 ERA and 14 with an ERA+ of at least 130 (indicating that he was at least 30 percent better than the league average in ERA those years). From 1995 through 2009, he had 30 or more saves in 14 of 15 seasons. Four times he was in the top six in voting for the Cy Young Award, including twice as a runner-up. Among pitchers to debut since 1969, Hoffman is one of only two ranked in the top 10 for lowest opponents' batting average against facing both lefties and righties. (Note: Pedro Martínez is the other; minimum 2,000 batters faced on a given side) He retired ranked first with 856 games finished, ninth with 1,035 games pitched, seventh-lowest in hits per nine innings (H/9) at 6.99, and seventh-best in strikeout-to-walk ratio (K/BB) of 3.69. He had a 2.87 ERA and 1.06 walks plus hits per inning pitched (WHIP) for his career.

Though he was not a power pitcher, Hoffman was a strikeout pitcher. His 9.36 K/9 was the fifth-highest in MLB history, and highest ever among relievers. Sports journalist Fran Zimniuch wrote in Fireman: The Evolution of the Closer in Baseball that Hoffman was "a thinking man's closer, using guile rather than heat." As the velocity of his fastball decreased, he compensated with a devastating changeup that is as synonymous a pitch with Hoffman as the splitter is with Bruce Sutter or the cutter is with Mariano Rivera. "It's a tough situation throwing a change-up in the ninth inning, unless you've got Trevor's changeup", closer Billy Wagner said. "There's not many guys who have a changeup that's dominating", All-Star third basemen Scott Rolen said. "But his is dominating. It's a weapon. That's not usually a word you use with a changeup." Robb Nen, a retired closer, was amazed at how Hoffman got better after he lost velocity on his fastball. "I don't think I could do it, to just lose the ability to throw 95 and still be one of the best. I have tremendous respect for him", Nen said. Another retired closer, Troy Percival, concurred about the difficulty in transforming from a power pitching style. "It's not easy to do. Guys who throw 95, 96 [mph] have an ego about being able to do that. [Hoffman] just went right into, 'Hey, you know, I throw 87 now. This is what I've got.' And he goes out there and gets it done just as well as he ever did."

[Hoffman is] unique in the sense that what he does, closing, is usually a power pitcher's game. His change-up isn't just great, but dominating. What he does puts things in perspective. It's pitching, not just throwing, and using whatever stuff you have. He throws a pitch that looks so tempting that you can't lay off it. ... I feel vulnerable when I throw 93-96 mph. He's throwing 81 and doing it with full confidence.

— Randy Johnson, retired pitcher

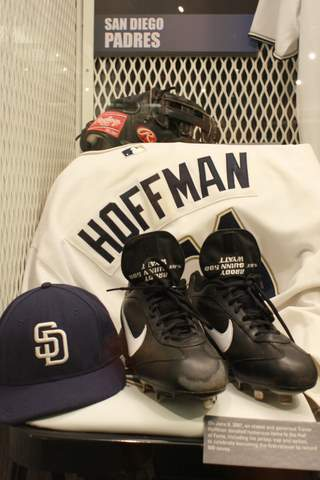
Items from Hoffman's 500th save donated to the National Baseball Hall of Fame and Museum

During the time Hoffman held the career record for saves, many still considered Rivera the best closer of all time. Like many other relievers of his era, Hoffman was compared to Rivera and his success in the playoffs. While Hoffman had 601 regular-season saves, he only had four in the playoffs along with a 3.46 postseason ERA. He lacked the postseason opportunities and success of Rivera, who had 42 saves and an 0.70 ERA in the playoffs as the Yankees advanced to the postseason 17 times and won five World Series during his career. During Hoffman's tenure in San Diego, the Padres won at least 90 games only twice and had nine losing seasons, including five with no more than 70 wins. Hoffman, however, did blow a save opportunity in his only World Series appearance and also failed on save tries twice in the final three days of the 2007 season as the Padres vied for the playoffs. Rivera broke Hoffman's career save record in 2011, and finished his career with 652.

In 2014, Major League Baseball introduced the Trevor Hoffman National League Reliever of the Year Award, which is awarded annually to the top reliever in the NL. Hoffman was elected into the Baseball Hall of Fame in 2018, becoming the sixth member to be elected who was primarily a reliever during their career. Zimniuch wrote that Hoffman and Rivera are "the best of the best of the one-inning closers". Less than 10 percent of Hoffman's saves were over one inning. Closers as a whole have been criticized for pitching almost exclusively in the ninth inning with no runners on base, while star relievers previously were called firemen, entering games in the middle of innings with runners on base and capable of pitching multiple innings. After Hoffman retired, saves became devalued as a primary evaluator of closers, and his career numbers—including sabermetric statistics like Wins Above Replacement (WAR), Win probability added (WPA), and Jaffe Wins Above Replacement Score (JAWS)—were more heavily scrutinized than for relievers elected before him. Still, his large volume of saves made him a strong candidate for the Hall of Fame. Some opponents of his induction maintained that his limited innings mitigated his impact compared to starting pitchers who have not been inducted, while others posited that those starters could have excelled as closers, but Hoffman would not have succeeded as a starter. Hoffman pitched 1,089 1/3 innings in his career, which topped only Sutter (1,042) among pitchers in the Hall of Fame. The two are the only Hall of Fame pitchers to never start a game.

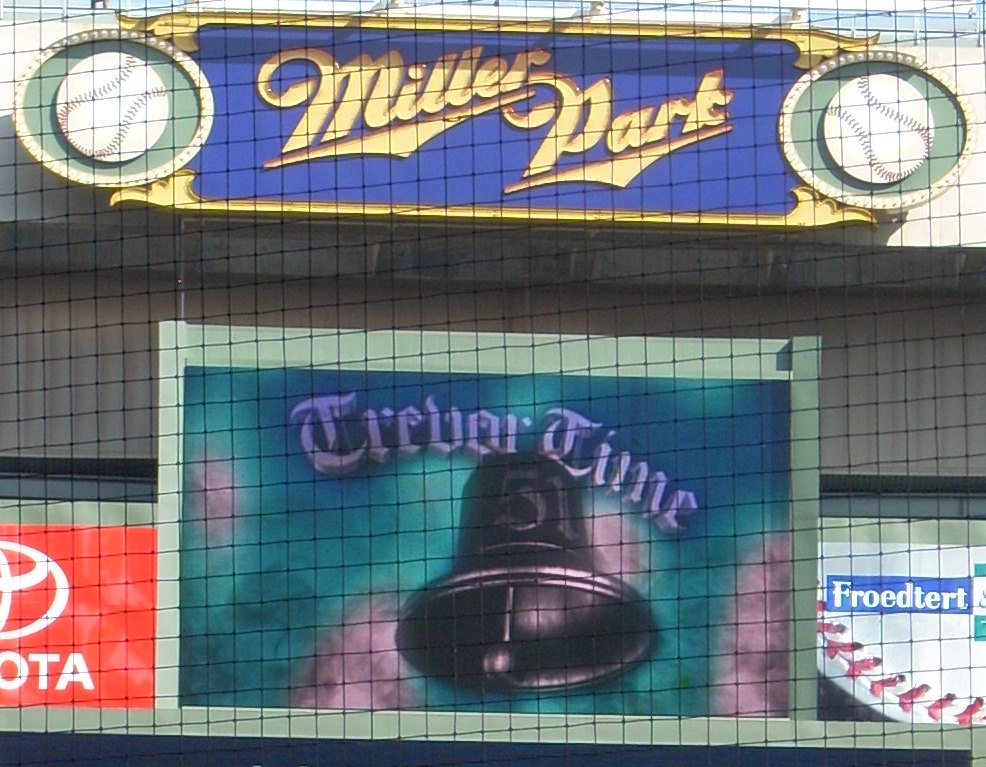
"Trevor Time" continued with the Brewers.

Hoffman's entrance into games, accompanied by the playing of "Hells Bells", became popular among fans after it was introduced in 1998. Tom Verducci of Sports Illustrated wrote that Hoffman's "signature moment is one of the most electrically charged in sports: Padres fans rising and roaring, in Pavlovian fashion, upon hearing the first bell toll, the foreboding bonging like something out of Hitchcock as Hoffman enters slowly, stage right." Opposing closer Jason Isringhausen said, "'Hells Bells' in San Diego is Trevor. It's like when you go there, you want to [win] two out of three so you can hear it once." Bill Center, writing for The San Diego Union-Tribune, once said "[Hoffman's] entrance was more suited to the World Wrestling Federation than the national pastime." Other teams contacted the Padres for videos of the "Trevor Time" production. Yankees executives witnessing Hoffman's entrance in 1998 were inspired to use the song "Enter Sandman" for Rivera's entrance starting the following season.

== Accomplishments ==
=== Awards and honors ===
Award/Honor	Time(s)	Date(s)
Delivery Man of the Month Award	4 (Note: Most times won)	May 2005, September 2006, May 2007, May 2009
Hutch Award	1	2004
Lou Gehrig Memorial Award	1	2006
National League All-Star	7	1998, 1999, 2000, 2002, 2006, 2007, 2009
National League Pitcher of the Month	2	May 2005, May 2009
National League Rolaids Relief Man Award	2	1998, 2006
National League saves leader	2	1998, 2006
Sporting News Reliever of the Year Award	3	1996, 1998, 2006

=== Active records ===
Statistics as of 2011 season

MLB Records
Accomplishment	Record	Refs
Regular season
Most career saves in National League	601	
Most consecutive seasons with at least 40 saves (Note: Tied for most times with Francisco Rodríguez and Craig Kimbrel)	4 (1998–2001, 2004–2007)	
Most seasons with at least 40 saves (Note: Tied for most times with Mariano Rivera)	9 (1996, 1998–2001, 2004–2007)	
Most career strikeouts per nine innings by a reliever	9.36	
Most career games pitched with one team in National League	902	

Padres Records
Accomplishment	Record	Refs
Regular season
Most career saves	552	
Most saves in a single season	53 (1998)	
Most consecutive save opportunities converted (Note: Tied for most times with Heath Bell)	41	
Most career games pitched	902	
Lowest career ERA	2.76	
Most career strikeouts per nine innings	9.72	
Lowest career batting average against	.211	

=== Former records ===
MLB Records
Accomplishment	Former record	Broken by	Refs
Regular season
Most career saves	601	Mariano Rivera (2011)	
Most seasons with at least 20 saves	15 (1994–2002, 2004–2009)	Mariano Rivera (2013)	
Most consecutive seasons with at least 30 saves	8 (1995–2002)	Mariano Rivera (2011)	
Most seasons with at least 30 saves	14 (1995–2002, 2004–2009)	Mariano Rivera (2013)	
Most career games finished	856	Mariano Rivera (2011)	
Most career games pitched with one team	902	Mariano Rivera (2009)	
Most consecutive save opportunities converted	41 (Note: Previously tied with Rod Beck)	Tom Gordon (1999)	

=== Other MLB rankings ===
- Most saves, career: 601 (2nd)
- Lowest H/9, career: 6.99 (7th)
- Highest K/BB, career: 3.69 (7th)
- Most games pitched, career: 1,035 (9th)

== Post-playing career ==
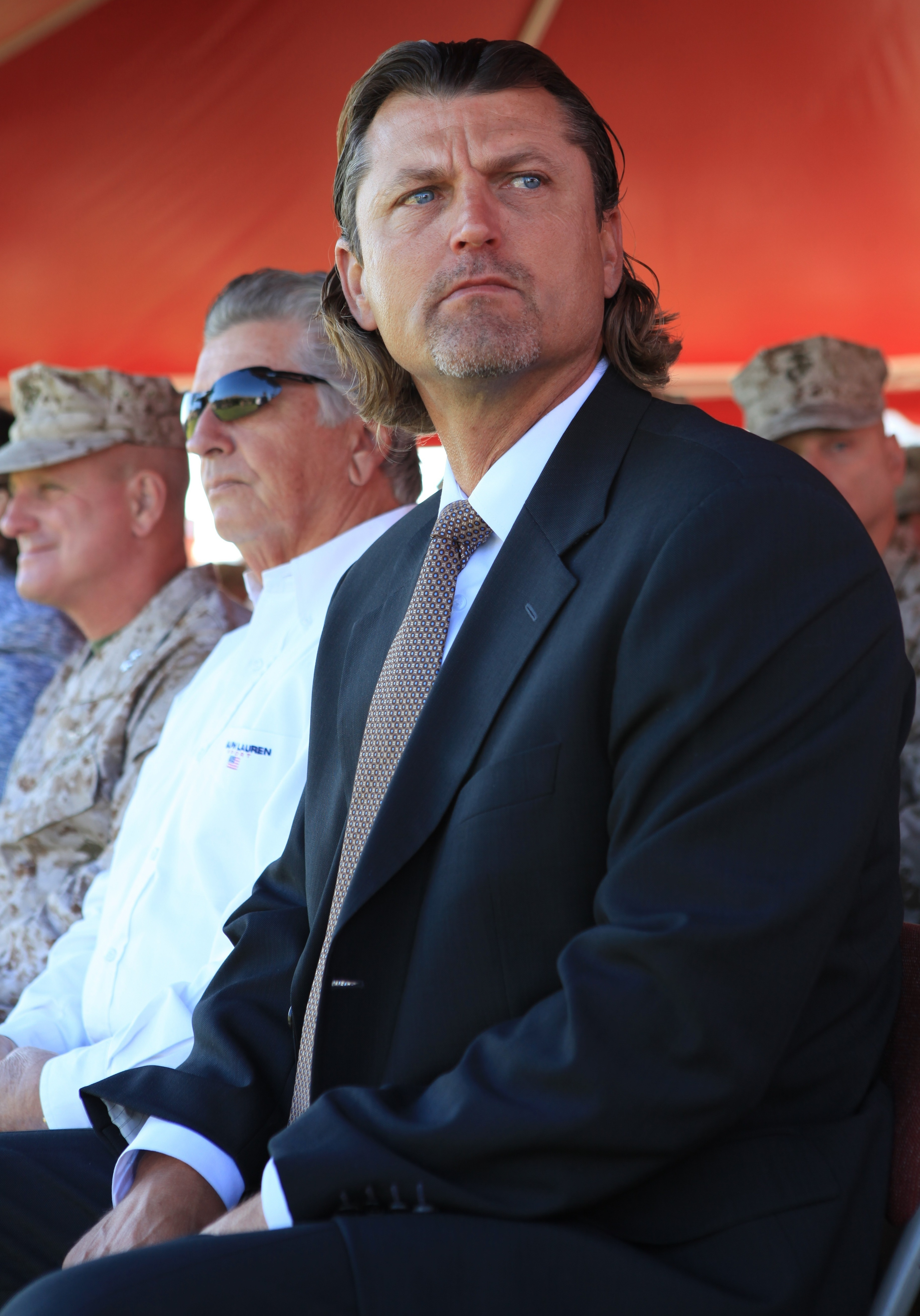
Hoffman at Marine Corps Air Station Miramar in 2018. His father served in the Marines.

Coinciding with his retirement from playing in 2011, Hoffman returned to San Diego as a special assistant to Padres team president and COO Tom Garfinkel. "There's been a turnover of people [in the Padres front office] who wanted to reconcile and I've been cool with it. A couple of years definitely makes a big difference", said Hoffman. In addition to his front office role, he also served as an instructor during spring training. In 2014, Hoffman became San Diego's upper-level pitching coordinator, essentially an additional pitching coach for the Padres at their Double-A and Triple-A levels. His new role also involved assisting San Diego general manager Josh Byrnes. Under general manager A. J. Preller in 2015, Hoffman became senior advisor for baseball operations, overseeing pitching instruction at all levels of the Padres' minor league system. Hoffman was the bullpen coach for the Great Britain team during the qualifying round of the 2017 World Baseball Classic. He was eligible on the basis of his maternal ancestry to England.

== Personal life ==
Hoffman met his wife Tracy in Buffalo, New York, in 1992, where she was a real estate agent and a member of the National Football League's Buffalo Bills cheerleading squad. He asked her to marry him in 1993 while she was on the field during Super Bowl XXVII (which the Bills lost to the Dallas Cowboys, 52–17). Hoffman and his wife have three sons: Brody, Quinn, and Wyatt. The family lived in a house in Rancho Santa Fe, California, for nearly two decades before selling it in 2019.

Hoffman's father died of cancer on Super Bowl Sunday in 1995.

Hoffman donated $200 for every save to the National Kidney Foundation. In honor of his father, a former Marine, Hoffman annually paid for game tickets and meals for 1,000 members of the military and their families.

== See also ==
- List of Major League Baseball career games played as a pitcher leaders
- List of Major League Baseball career games finished leaders
- List of Major League Baseball career WHIP leaders
- List of Major League Baseball individual streaks
- List of Major League Baseball career saves leaders
- List of San Diego Padres team records
- San Diego Padres award winners and league leaders

== Notes ==
Achievements
Preceded by Lee Smith	All-Time Saves Leader; 2006–2010	Succeeded by Mariano Rivera
