= Rich Rodriguez (baseball) =

American baseball player (born 1963)

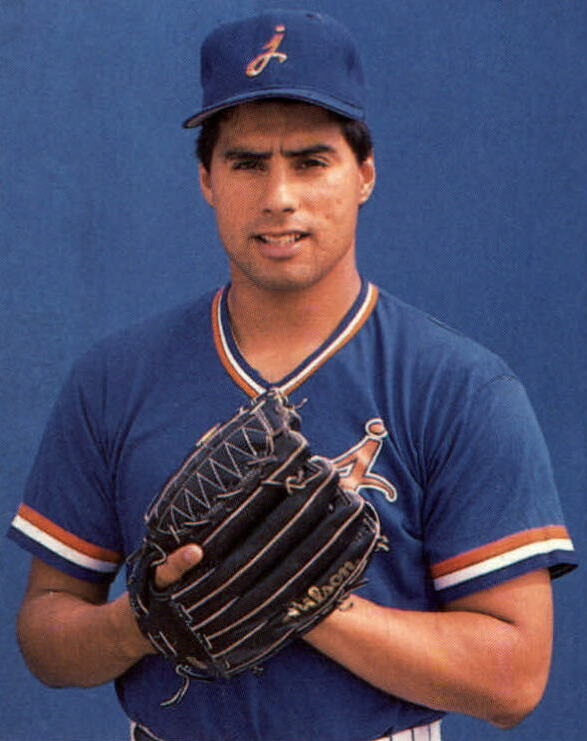
- Rodriguez with the Jackson Mets c. 1988
- Pitcher
- Born: March 1, 1963 (age 63); Downey, California, U.S.
- Batted: Left Threw: Left

MLB debut
- June 30, 1990, for the San Diego Padres

Last MLB appearance
- May 3, 2003, for the Anaheim Angels

MLB statistics
- Win–loss record: 31–22
- Earned run average: 3.81
- Strikeouts: 396
- Stats at Baseball Reference

Teams
- San Diego Padres (1990–1993); Florida Marlins (1993); St. Louis Cardinals (1994–1995); San Francisco Giants (1997–1999); New York Mets (2000); Cleveland Indians (2001); Texas Rangers (2002); Anaheim Angels (2003)

Richard Anthony Rodriguez (born March 1, 1963) is an American former professional baseball player who pitched in the Major Leagues from 1990 to 2003.

Rodriguez was drafted by the Kansas City Royals in the 17th round of the 1981 Major League Baseball draft, but did not sign, opting to attend the University of Tennessee. He was drafted again by the New York Mets in the 9th round of the 1984 Major League Baseball draft, and signed.

Prior to the 1989 season, Rodriguez was traded by the Mets to the San Diego Padres for minor leaguers Bill Stevenson and Brad Pounders. He made his major league debut in 1990 with the Padres and played for them until June 24, 1993, when he and Gary Sheffield were traded to the Florida Marlins for Andres Berumen, Trevor Hoffman and Jose Martinez.

In 1994, he was released by the Marlins and signed with the St. Louis Cardinals. In 1996, he signed with the Cincinnati Reds, but was released during spring training. He signed with the Royals and spent the season in the minor leagues.

After the 1996 season, he signed with the San Francisco Giants, where he played for three seasons. He signed with the Mets for the 2000 season.

In 2001, he played for the Cleveland Indians. He signed with the Texas Rangers for the 2002 season, and the Anaheim Angels for the 2003 season.
