= Randy Smith (baseball) =

American professional baseball executive (born 1963)

- Born: June 15, 1963 (age 63); Houston, Texas, U.S.
- Occupation: Baseball executive

Randall Smith (born June 15, 1963) is an American professional baseball executive. He has served as general manager of Major League Baseball's San Diego Padres (1993–95) and Detroit Tigers (1996–2002), and as assistant general manager for the Colorado Rockies (1991–93). He currently works in the front office of the Hokkaido Nippon-Ham Fighters of Nippon Professional Baseball.

== Biography ==
Randy is the son of baseball executive Tal Smith. He began working for the San Diego Padres in 1984, and served as the Padres' scouting director from 1989 to 1991. He then served as the assistant general manager for the expansion Colorado Rockies until 1993.

=== San Diego Padres ===
Smith became the general manager of the Padres in the middle of the 1993 at the age of 29. At the time, he was the youngest GM in baseball history. Shortly after being named GM, Smith was forced to put the team through a "fire sale," dumping payroll by trading away most of the team's expensive players for cheaper younger players. In a highly criticized trade at the time, Smith traded away star Gary Sheffield in June 1993 to the Florida Marlins for unknown rookie Trevor Hoffman. Sheffield had won the NL batting title the year before and was MVP runner-up. Smith said at the time, "The only way to acquire quality players is to give up quality." While Sheffield would go on to hit 500 career home runs, Hoffman spent the next 16 years with San Diego and would set the Major League record for saves, earn induction into the baseball Hall of Fame, and have his number retired by the Padres. Less than a month after the Sheffield trade, Smith traded away another All-Star in Fred McGriff. The fire sale was completed on July 26th when Bruce Hurst and Greg Harris were moved to Colorado in exchange for future All-Stars Andy Ashby and Brad Ausmus, as well as Doug Bochtler. While San Diego dropped to last in the NL West in 1993, Hoffman and Ashby would become major contributors for the eventual National League champion Padres.

Smith acquired future MVP Ken Caminiti and future All-Star Steve Finley in a 12-player trade with the Houston Astros on December 28, 1994. Only a year and a half removed from the infamous fire sale in 1993, the Padres were under new ownership and looking to improve, even if it meant taking on more salary.

=== Detroit Tigers ===
Smith joined the Detroit Tigers in 1996 and spent six years as vice president of baseball operations and general manager. During this time, the club received Organization of the Year Honors from Baseball America and Howe Sports Data in 1997. He was also named Baseball America's American League Executive of the Year in 1997.

Smith inherited a Tigers roster that was in flux with the retirements of stars Alan Trammell, Lou Whitaker, and Kirk Gibson, as well as longtime manager Sparky Anderson. To obtain young and inexpensive talent, Smith traded away highly paid all-stars Travis Fryman and Cecil Fielder. Smith was known for several trades involving the Tigers and his former team, the San Diego Padres, and for several trades with the Astros, where his father Tal Smith was president of baseball operations. Under Smith, the Tigers acquired a host of young players that were listed as Top 100 prospects by Baseball America, including former top 10 prospects Brian Hunter, Andújar Cedeño, Matt Drews, and the 1997 first-overall pick Matt Anderson. Despite the collection of younger talent, the Tigers failed to achieve a winning record in any of Smith's seven seasons with the club.

Prior to the 2000 season, Smith pulled off a blockbuster trade, acquiring two-time MVP Juan Gonzalez from the Texas Rangers. “We’ve been working the last couple of years to acquire a marquee player,” Smith said, calling Gonzalez “a franchise player and future Hall of Famer.” Gonzalez had been one of the most feared hitters in the American League, averaging 43 homeruns and 140 RBI over the previous 4 seasons. However, Gonzalez had a down year in Detroit, hitting only 22 home runs with 67 RBI, as Detroit finished third in the AL Central. Gonzalez left in free agency at the end of the season. The Tigers regressed in 2001. Following a 0–6 start to the 2002 season, Smith was fired along with manager Phil Garner.

==== Post-Tigers ====
Smith returned to the Padres in 2003 as director of professional and international scouting. In 2011, Smith was named vice president of player development for the Padres. He remained in the role until the end of the 2016 season.

In December 2016, the Hokkaido Nippon-Ham Fighters of Nippon Professional Baseball hired Smith as a senior advisor to their general manager. He still holds this role as of 2026. From 2018 to 2024, he also served as a professional scout for MLB's Texas Rangers.

Preceded by Joe McIlvaine	San Diego Padres General manager 1993–1995	Succeeded by Kevin Towers
Preceded by Joe Klein	Detroit Tigers General manager 1996–2002	Succeeded by Dave Dombrowski
