= Andrés Berumen =

Mexican baseball player (born 1971)

- Pitcher
- Born: April 5, 1971 (age 54); Tijuana, Baja California, Mexico
- Batted: Right Threw: Right

MLB debut
- April 27, 1995, for the San Diego Padres

Last MLB appearance
- June 17, 1996, for the San Diego Padres

MLB statistics
- Win–loss record: 2–3
- Earned run average: 5.66
- Strikeouts: 46
- Stats at Baseball Reference

Teams
- San Diego Padres (1995–1996)

Andres Berumen (born April 5, 1971) is a Mexican former professional baseball pitcher. He played parts of two seasons in Major League Baseball for the San Diego Padres.

== Career ==
Berumen was drafted 27th overall by the Kansas City Royals in 1989. San Diego Padres acquired him from the Florida Marlins, with José Martínez and Trevor Hoffman, for Gary Sheffield and Rich Rodriguez on June 24, 1993. On April 27, 1995, Berumen made his major league debut, becoming the first Tijuana native to reach the majors.

On May 15, 1995, Berumen picked up his only save at the major league level. He pitched a perfect 9th inning to hold down a 7-5 Padres victory over the Cardinals. Also played for the High Desert Mavericks minor league team in California.

== Personal life ==
Born in Tijuana, Berumen moved to the Los Angeles area at the age of 12.
