= Kevin Towers =

American baseball executive

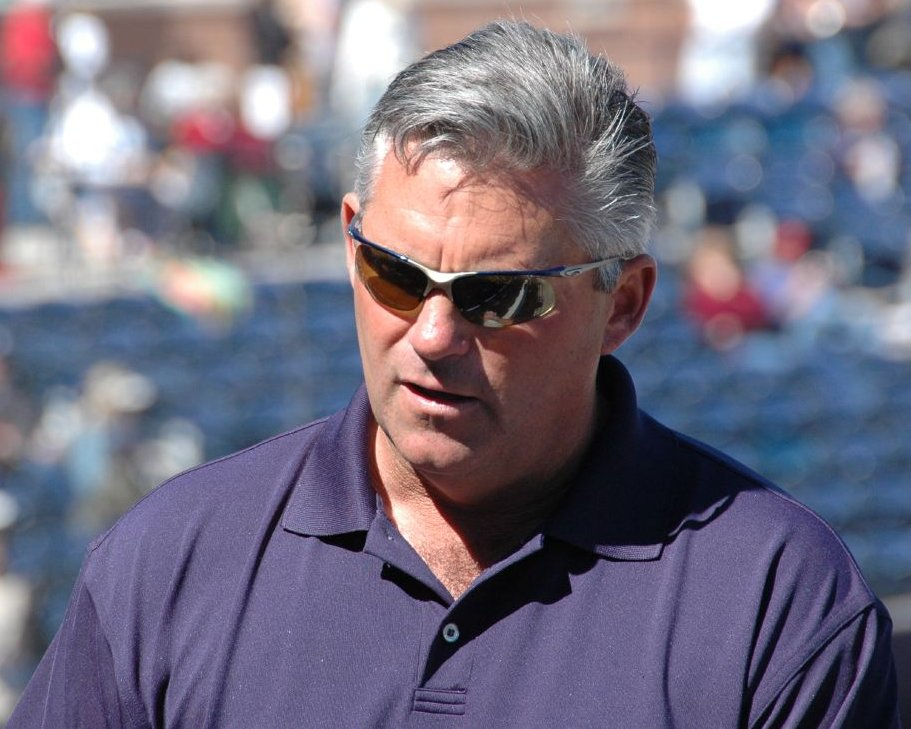
- Towers in 2007
- Born: November 11, 1961; Medford, Oregon, U.S.
- Died: January 30, 2018 (aged 56); San Diego, California, U.S.
- Other names: "The Gunslinger"; "KT"
- Education: MiraCosta College; Brigham Young University
- Occupation: General manager
- Organizations: San Diego Padres (1995–2009); Arizona Diamondbacks (2010–2014)

Kevin Scott Towers (November 11, 1961 – January 30, 2018) was an American executive in Major League Baseball. He served as the general manager of the San Diego Padres from 1995 to 2009 and for the Arizona Diamondbacks from 2010 to 2014.

== Early life and education ==
Towers attended North Medford High School in Medford, Oregon, where he played baseball, football, and basketball. He graduated in 1979.

== Playing career ==
Towers began his college baseball career for MiraCosta College. He transferred to Brigham Young University (BYU), where he played for the BYU Cougars baseball team in the Western Athletic Conference (WAC) for one year. As a pitcher, Towers was selected to the All-WAC team. The San Diego Padres selected him in the first round of the secondary phase of the 1982 Major League Baseball draft, and he was named a Texas League all-star in 1984.

Towers pitched in Minor League Baseball in San Diego's farm system for seven years. Overall, he had a 29–40 win–loss record and a 4.64 earned run average in 619 innings pitched, including 82 games started.

== Post-playing career ==
Continuing his career in baseball, Towers became a pitching coach for minor league Single-A Spokane Indians in 1989 and 1990. He served as a scout for the Padres from 1989 through 1991 and for the Pittsburgh Pirates from 1991 through 1993. Towers rejoined the Padres as scouting director in 1993.

Towers became the Padres' seventh general manager in 1995, succeeding Randy Smith. As GM, Towers led the Padres to four division championships and an appearance in the 1998 World Series. In November 1998 after the Padres' World Series appearance, San Diego voters approved funding to build the team's new stadium, Petco Park. The Padres also finished last in their division five times. Towers was known for his ability to find talented pitchers that many other teams had released. On October 3, 2009, the Padres fired Towers after two disappointing seasons. Towers joined the New York Yankees as a special assignment scout for the 2010 season.

On September 22, 2010, the Arizona Diamondbacks hired Towers as their general manager. In his first season at the helm of the Diamondbacks' baseball operations, the team won 94 games and the National League West Division title just one season after finishing in last place with 97 losses.

Following the 2013 season, Towers fired his pitching coach, Charles Nagy, partly for refusing to instruct pitchers to hit players on opposing teams, saying, "while in the old days this was known, now you have to teach it." It was duly noted by journalists that the Diamondbacks pitchers hit 60 batters last season, while their batters were hit only 43 times.

On May 17, 2014, the Diamondbacks hired Tony La Russa to oversee Towers and all baseball operations. The Diamondbacks dismissed Towers from the general manager position on September 5, while offering him another position in the organization, which he declined. In 2015, he joined the Cincinnati Reds as a scout and special assistant to general manager Walt Jocketty.

== Death ==
Towers was diagnosed with cancer in 2016. He died of anaplastic thyroid cancer on January 30, 2018, at a hospital in San Diego. He was posthumously inducted into the San Diego Padres Hall of Fame on May 12, 2018, as part of a week-long celebration of the Padres' 1998 National League championship team.

Sporting positions
Preceded by Randy Smith	San Diego Padres General Manager; 1995–2009	Succeeded by Jed Hoyer
Preceded by Jerry Dipoto	Arizona Diamondbacks General Manager; 2010–2014	Succeeded by Dave Stewart
