= Gary Sheffield =

American baseball player (born 1968)

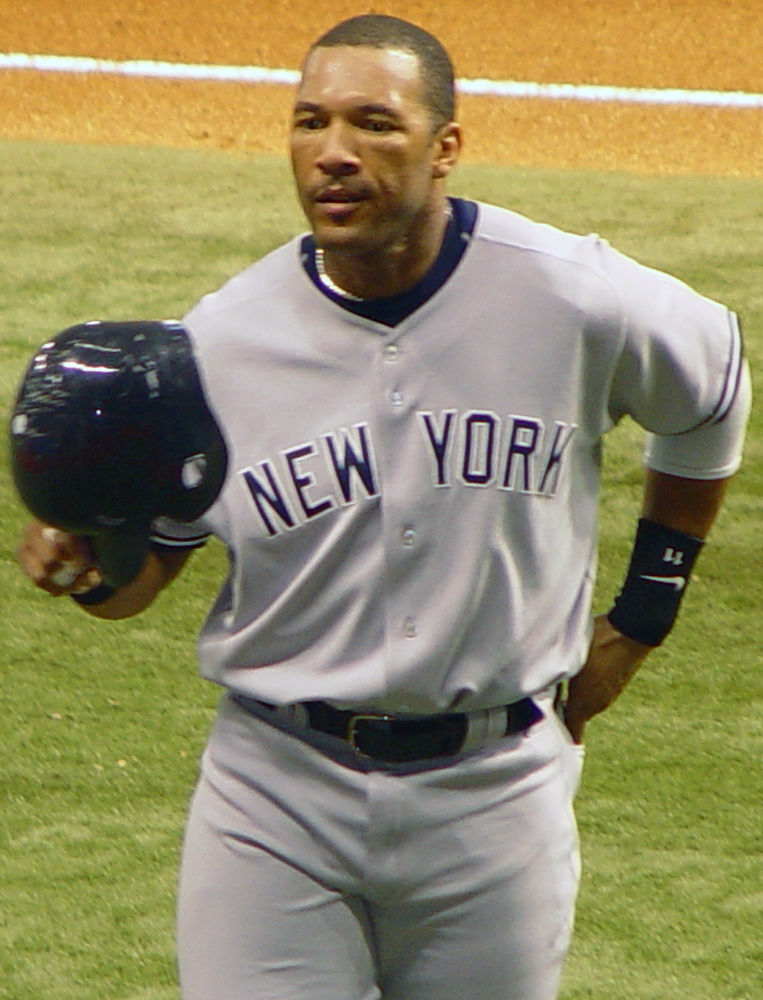
- Sheffield with the New York Yankees in 2005
- Outfielder / Third baseman
- Born: November 18, 1968 (age 57); Tampa, Florida, U.S.
- Batted: Right Threw: Right

MLB debut
- September 15, 1988, for the Milwaukee Brewers

Last MLB appearance
- September 30, 2009, for the New York Mets

MLB statistics
- Batting average: .292
- Hits: 2,689
- Home runs: 509
- Runs batted in: 1,676
- Stats at Baseball Reference

Teams
- Milwaukee Brewers (1988–1991); San Diego Padres (1992–1993); Florida Marlins (1993–1998); Los Angeles Dodgers (1998–2001); Atlanta Braves (2002–2003); New York Yankees (2004–2006); Detroit Tigers (2007–2008); New York Mets (2009)

Career highlights and awards
- 9× All-Star (1992, 1993, 1996, 1998–2000, 2003–2005); World Series champion (1997); 5× Silver Slugger Award (1992, 1996, 2003–2005); NL batting champion (1992)

Gary Antonian Sheffield (born November 18, 1968) is an American former professional baseball outfielder who played in Major League Baseball (MLB) for eight teams from 1988 to 2009. After his playing career, he became a sports agent.

For most of his career, Sheffield played right field, though he has also played left field, third base, shortstop, and a handful of games at first base. He played for the Milwaukee Brewers, San Diego Padres, Florida Marlins, Los Angeles Dodgers, Atlanta Braves, New York Yankees, Detroit Tigers, and the New York Mets. Sheffield was a first-round pick of the Brewers, who selected him sixth overall in the 1986 amateur draft after a standout prep career at Hillsborough High School in Tampa, Florida. He batted and threw right-handed. Sheffield hit his 500th home run on April 17, 2009. As of his last game, Sheffield ranked second among all active players in walks (1,475), third in runs (1,636), fourth in RBIs (1,676), fifth in hits (2,689) and home runs (509), and sixth in hit by pitches (135). He is the only player in history to record 100 RBIs in a season for five different teams. Sheffield's batting swing was an exemplary mix of savage speed and pinpoint control. Despite his high home run total, Sheffield only topped 80 strikeouts twice in 22 seasons, while finishing his career among the all-time top 20 walks leaders. Because of his combination of skill, sportswriter Joe Posnanski wrote, "I can't imagine there has ever been a scarier hitter to face." His first manager Tom Trebelhorn said, "Gary can turn on a 38-caliber bullet.”

He is the nephew of Dwight Gooden. After retirement, he started to work as an agent. His clients include former reliever Jason Grilli. Sheffield was mentioned in the Mitchell Report and implicated in the BALCO scandal with respect to the use of performance-enhancing drugs.

== Early life ==
Sheffield was born in Tampa, Florida and grew up in Belmont Heights, near the Ponce de Leon projects. He and his family lived with his uncle, Dwight Gooden, who would go on to become an ace pitcher for the New York Mets. They played baseball frequently and Sheffield learned how to hit a fastball from Gooden, who is only four years older than he is.

Sheffield was a good hitter in Little League. However, he had problems with his temper and attitude, which would continue in the majors. Once, when he was late to practice, his coach benched him and Sheffield picked up a bat and chased the coach all over the field, resulting in him being kicked off the team for a year. When Sheffield was eleven, he was selected to the Belmont Heights Little League All-Stars, which included future Chicago Cubs first round pick Ty Griffin, future major leaguer Derek Bell, and other future Major League Baseball (MLB) players. The team made it to the finals of the 1980 Little League World Series but lost to Taiwan 4–3. Sheffield set a record for doubles that would be broken in 2012 by Bradley Smith.

=== High school ===
In 1983, Sheffield made the Hillsborough High School varsity baseball team. During his junior year, he bulked up to 175 pounds and was a pitcher and third baseman. During his senior year, his fastball reached the upper 80's and he frequently showed home run power. As a batter, Sheffield hit .500 and 15 home runs in 62 official at-bats. At the end of the season, he was named the Gatorade National Player of the Year.

== Professional baseball career ==
=== Minor leagues ===
After high school, the Milwaukee Brewers drafted Sheffield with the sixth pick of the first round of the 1986 MLB draft. Sheffield later said that if he had not been drafted in the first round, he probably would have played college baseball for the Miami Hurricanes. After being drafted he played for the Helena Brewers of the Pioneer League, where he had a .365 batting average and 71 RBIs in 57 games. The only question was what position he would play. He was slotted at shortstop, but struggled at the position, committing many errors and wild throws. In 1987, he was assigned to Stockton of the Class-A California League, where his defense improved and he produced at the plate. His batting average went below .300, but he led the league in RBIs with 103, and at the end of the year he was voted the Brewers' best prospect. In his third season, he went from Double-A to the majors. In 134 games for the El Paso Diablos and Denver Zephyrs, he batted .327 with 28 homers and 118 RBIs.

=== Milwaukee Brewers ===
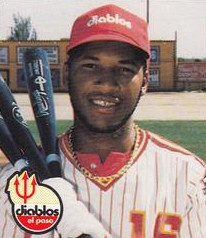
Sheffield with the El Paso Diablos in 1988

Sheffield was called up from the minors when rosters were expanded in September and made his major league debut on September 3, 1988. Still a teenager, he got off to a fast start, with his first career hit being a home run off Mark Langston, though Sheffield finished the season with a .238 batting average and four home runs in 24 games. After mediocre play and injuries that forced him to miss two months in the summer of 1989, Sheffield was moved to third base, replaced by Bill Spiers at shortstop. Sheffield said he was shocked by the move and criticized the team. He also said his race affected the reception from other players, management, and fans in Milwaukee. In his rookie season, he batted .247 with five home runs and 32 RBIs. In 1990, he worked under Don Baylor, who had been hired as their hitting coach. He finished the season batting .294, with 10 home runs. In his final season with the Brewers, he injured his wrist, thumb, and shoulder, playing in only 50 games.

=== San Diego Padres ===
After four seasons in Milwaukee, the Brewers traded Sheffield to the San Diego Padres for Ricky Bones, José Valentin, and Matt Mieske on March 26, 1992. Sheffield faced his uncle Dwight Gooden for the first time in a Major League game on May 12, 1992, getting a hit in three at-bats. In his first All-Star season, he contended for the Triple Crown for much of the year; while he missed out on the home run (33, two fewer than the leader, teammate Fred McGriff) and RBIs (100, nine fewer than leader Darren Daulton) titles, he won the National League batting title (the only one of the nine in Padre history not won by Tony Gwynn) with a .330 average. He started the 1993 season by hitting 10 home runs and batting .295 with the Padres.

=== Florida Marlins ===
On June 24, 1993, Sheffield was traded with Rich Rodriguez to the Florida Marlins for Trevor Hoffman, José Martínez, and Andrés Berumen in what was thought to be a cost-cutting measure by the team. He finished the season hitting 10 home runs, batting .292, and driving in 37 runs with the Marlins and was the starting third baseman for the National League in the All-Star Game. After the season, Sheffield signed a four-year, $22.5 million contract with the Marlins that made him the highest-paid third baseman. In 1994, the Marlins moved him from third base to right field. He never regularly played in the infield for the rest of his career. Sheffield hit 112 home runs with the Marlins from 1994 to 1998, including 42 in 1996, which saw him named to the All-Star Game for the first time since 1993.

In April 1997, he signed a six-year contract extension worth $61 million that would run through the 2003 season. While the 1997 season saw Sheffield play only 135 games, he batted .250 while having 21 home runs and 121 walks. On July 13 of that season, Sheffield became the first player in franchise history to hit two home runs in one inning. The Marlins ended up reaching the postseason that year and Sheffield played a key part in all sixteen games of their run to the World Series. The World Series pitted the Marlins versus the Cleveland Indians. Sheffield batted .292 in the series while leading both teams in walks with eight. Three of his five hits in the series game in Game 3, where he had a leadoff home run and drove in five total runs in the 14–11 victory. The Marlins ultimately won the Series in seven games for their first championship.

By early 1998, the Marlins were already set on trading pieces of their championship team away, with Kevin Brown and Moises Alou being the first to go. In April, Sheffield claimed he would've restructured his contract to keep the team together and was not consulted after the trades of Brown and Alou.

He was traded to the Los Angeles Dodgers in May 1998 because the Marlins allegedly could not afford a contract extension and because the Dodgers' parent company at the time, News Corporation, was looking to secure a television contract with the Marlins in exchange for trading popular Dodger Mike Piazza.

=== Los Angeles Dodgers ===
On May 14, 1998, Sheffield, Manuel Barrios, Charles Johnson, Bobby Bonilla, and Jim Eisenreich were traded to the Los Angeles Dodgers for Mike Piazza and Todd Zeile. Sheffield finished the season with the Dodgers batting .316, hitting 16 homers, and driving in 57 runs. In 3½ seasons with the Dodgers, he hit 129 home runs and drove in 367 runs. He made three All-Star games while playing with the Dodgers and had become one of the best hitting outfielders in the game. But during the off-season, he began lobbying for a trade because he thought the Dodgers were spending their money stupidly and sliding in the wrong direction, and publicly criticized coaches and teammates.

=== Atlanta Braves ===
On January 15, 2002, the Dodgers traded Sheffield to the Atlanta Braves for Brian Jordan, Odalis Pérez, and Andrew Brown. He spent two seasons with the Braves hitting 64 home runs and knocking in 216 RBIs including 132 in 2003. After two seasons with the Braves, he became a free agent for the first time in his career on October 27, 2003.

=== New York Yankees ===
On December 19, 2003, after negotiating with owner George Steinbrenner, Sheffield signed a $39 million, three-year contract with the New York Yankees. This deal included $13.5 million in deferred money and a $13 million team option for 2007. He joined a lineup that included Derek Jeter, Jason Giambi and the newly acquired Alex Rodriguez. In his first season with the Yankees, Sheffield started slowly but finished the season with 36 home runs, 121 RBIs, and a .290 batting average, finishing second in the MVP voting behind Vladimir Guerrero. On July 27, Sheffield hit his 400th career home run off of Micheal Nakamura of the Toronto Blue Jays.

In his second season with the Yankees, he continued to play well, hitting another 34 home runs and driving in 123 runs. On April 14, 2005, a Red Sox fan leaned over the railing at Fenway Park and distracted Sheffield as he was going to field a ball hit by Jason Varitek. After Sheffield took a swing at the fan with his glove, he threw the ball back into the infield, and then got into a verbal altercation with the fan. Fan interference was not called, resulting in a game-tying RBI triple for Varitek. The fan, a long-time season ticket holder, was not ejected from Fenway Park, but he donated his remaining 2005 season tickets to charity in an effort to avoid any controversy for the remainder of the season. Sheffield was fined for the incident. Charges were dismissed against both the fan and Sheffield.

Sheffield started the 2006 season on pace for a .300 batting average and 30 homers before he collided with Shea Hillenbrand of the Toronto Blue Jays on April 29. Sheffield tried to play despite the injury, but ultimately needed wrist surgery. Sheffield did not return until late September. He had lost his right field job to Bobby Abreu, whom the Yankees had acquired in a trade deadline transaction. This forced Sheffield to play first base for the first time in his MLB career. At the end of the 2006 season, the Yankees picked up Sheffield's 2007 option and traded him to the Detroit Tigers.

During a July 2007 interview with HBO's Real Sports, Sheffield said that Yankees manager Joe Torre treated black players differently from white players during his time there, citing himself, Kenny Lofton and Tony Womack as examples. Lofton later agreed with Sheffield's comments about being treated differently, but disagreed that race was the motivating factor. After it was pointed out that Derek Jeter is biracial, Sheffield responded that he wasn't "all the way black."

=== Detroit Tigers ===
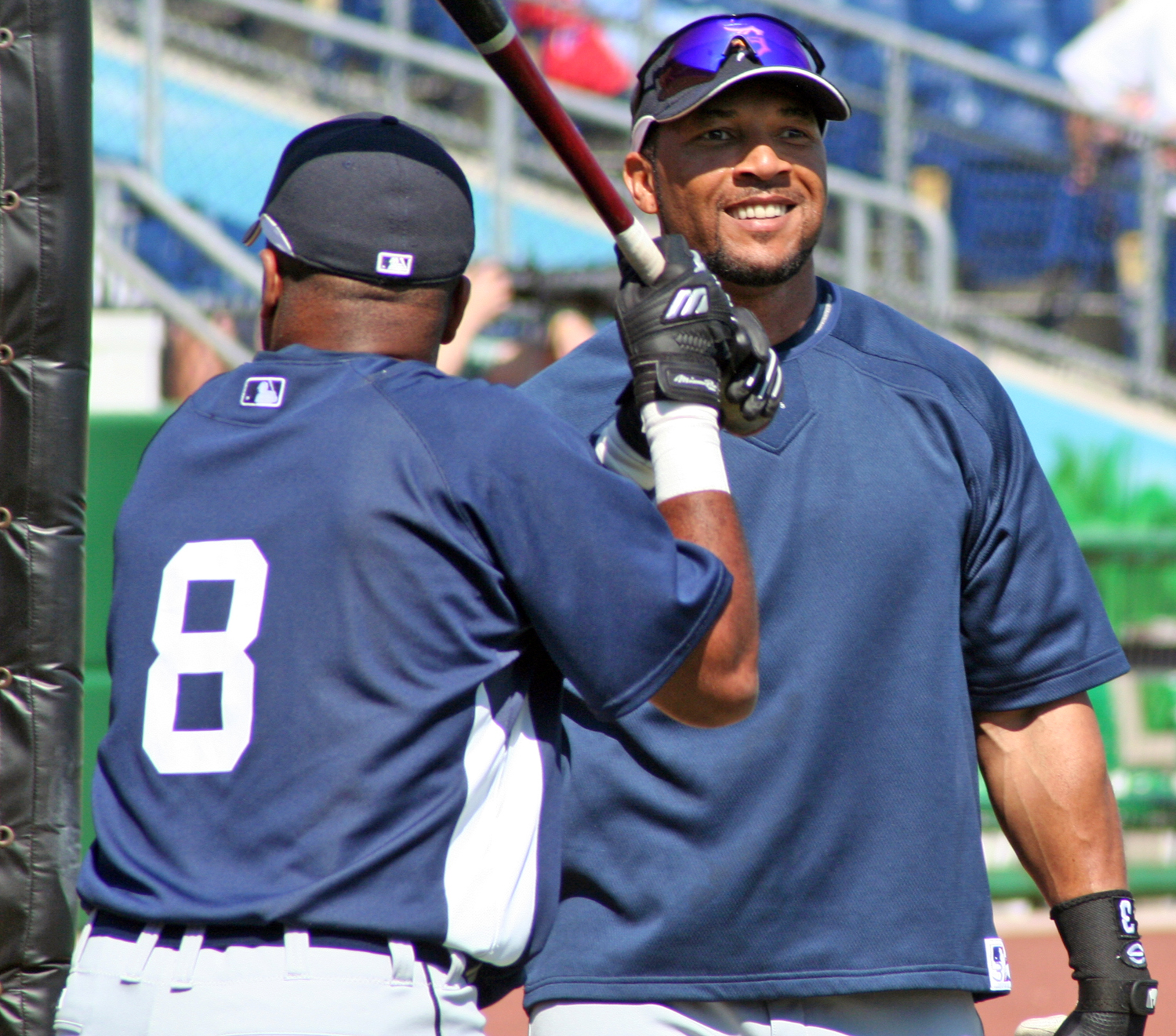
Sheffield (right) with the Tigers in 2007

On November 10, 2006, the Yankees traded Sheffield to the Detroit Tigers for minor league pitchers Humberto Sánchez, Kevin Whelan, and Anthony Claggett. After the trade, Sheffield agreed to a two-year, $28 million extension. In his first season with the Tigers, he hit 25 home runs with 75 RBIs and a .265 batting average. Sheffield also hit his first triple since 2004 and stole 20 bases for the first time since 1990. He was also one of six batters in the AL with least 20 home runs and 20 stolen bases, along with Alex Rodriguez, Grady Sizemore, Ian Kinsler, B. J. Upton and teammate at the time Curtis Granderson.

On September 8, 2008 in a game against Oakland, Sheffield hit the 250,000th regular season home run in MLB history according to Baseball-Reference.com. The home run was a grand slam off Gio González; Sheffield had hit baseball's 249,999th home run against Gonzalez in his previous at bat. Sheffield ended the 2008 season with 499 career home runs.

On September 19, 2008, Sheffield was hit by a pitch from Cleveland Indians pitcher Roberto Hernández (then using the name Fausto Carmona) and walked to first base. When Hernández threw to first base, he and Sheffield exchanged words and Sheffield charged the mound, attempting to tackle Hernández but being caught in a headlock and punched a few times on the top of his head by the pitcher, leading to a bench-clearing brawl. Hernández and Sheffield were both ejected, along with Indians catcher Víctor Martínez and Tigers second baseman Plácido Polanco. On September 22, the commissioner's office announced four suspensions resulting from the brawl: Hernández was suspended for six games, Sheffield received a four-game suspension, and Martinez and Indians infielder Asdrúbal Cabrera each received three-game suspensions. Sheffield said after the suspension that the involved players from the Indians would be "penalized" by him as well.

On March 31, 2009, the Tigers released Sheffield despite owing him $14 million. Tigers general manager Dave Dombrowski said the team wanted to have more versatility at designated hitter.

=== New York Mets ===
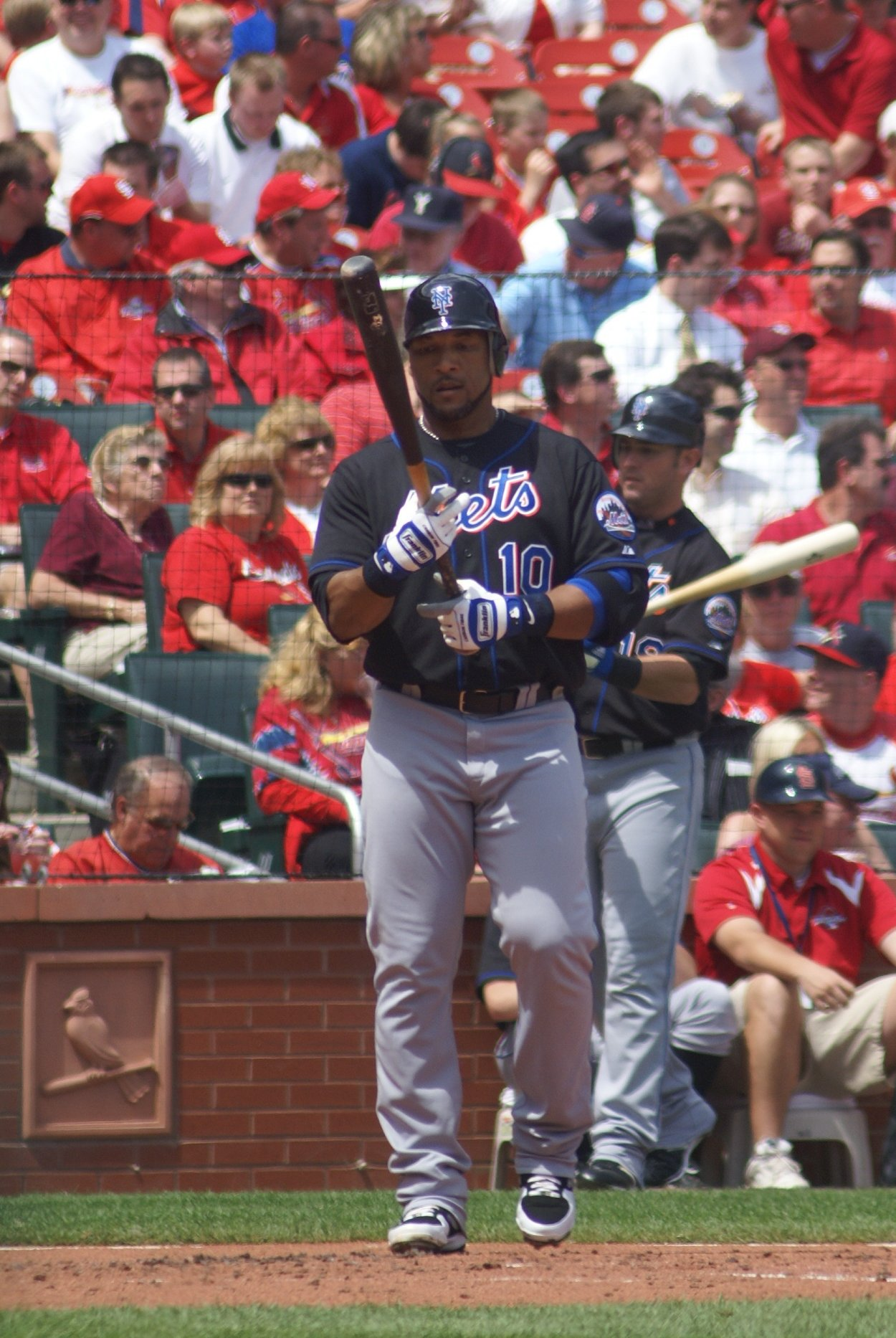
Sheffield with the New York Mets in 2009

On April 3, 2009 Sheffield agreed to sign with the New York Mets.

On April 17, Sheffield hit his 500th home run, becoming the 25th player in MLB history to reach that milestone, the first player to achieve this as a pinch-hitter, and the first to do so with the Mets. Sheffield was the third player in major league history to hit a home run before age 20 and after age 40, joining Ty Cobb and Rusty Staub. Alex Rodriguez became the fourth player to do so in 2015. Sheffield sat out a game in August when the Mets declined to offer him a contract extension.

=== Retirement ===
Sheffield did not play in 2010. Though he initially suggested he wanted to sign with a team for the 2011 season, he announced his retirement at the beginning of 2011 spring training.

== Career highlights ==
Championships earned or shared
Title	Times	Dates	Ref
National League batting champion	1	1992	
National League champion	1	1997	
World Series champion	1	1997	

Awards received
Name of award	Times	Dates	Ref
ESPY Award for Best Breakthrough Athlete	1	1993	
Florida Marlins Most Valuable Player Award	1	1996	
Gatorade National High School Baseball Player of the Year	1	1986	
Major League Baseball All-Star	9	1992–93, 1996, 1998–2000, 2003–05	
Major League Baseball Player of the Month	1	August 1992	
Major League Baseball Player of the Week	12	May 24, 1992; June 13, 1993; May 1, 1994; Sept. 24, 1995; Aug. 11, 1996; June 18, 2000; July 16, 2000; Apr 15, 2001; May 18, 2003; June 6, 2004; July 17, 2005; June 10, 2007	
Silver Slugger Award: at third base; 4× at outfield	5; 1; 4	1992; 1996, 2003−05	
Sporting News Comeback Player of the Year	1	1992	
Sporting News Major League Player of the Year	1	1992	
Sporting News Minor League Player of the Year	1	1988	
USA Today Top High School Baseball Player	1	1986	
Florida Sports Hall of	1	2018	

=== Achievements ===
- The second Padres hitter in franchise history to win a batting title, following Tony Gwynn
- Holds Los Angeles Dodgers single-season record for at-bats per home run (11.7 in 2000)
- His Tampa team finished second in the 1980 Little League World Series
- Is the first player to represent five different teams in the All-Star Game.
- Tied Paul O'Neill as the oldest player to hit 20 home runs and steal 20 bases in a season, at age 38 (2007)
- First player to hit at least 25 home runs for 6 different teams
- 25th player in MLB history to reach 500 home runs, and the first player to do so as a Met
- 8 seasons with 30 or more home runs
- Holds the record for most MLB ballparks played in (51)
- One of two players in MLB history, along with Fred McGriff, to have 30 or more home runs in one season for 5 different teams: Los Angeles Dodgers (three times); New York Yankees (twice); Atlanta Braves, Florida Marlins, and San Diego Padres (once)

=== Statistical leader ===
- Led National League in batting average (.330) and total bases (323) in 1992
- Led National League in on-base percentage (.465) and OPS (1.090) in 1996

=== National Baseball Hall of Fame consideration ===
Sheffield first appeared on balloting for the National Baseball Hall of Fame in 2015, when he received 11.7% of the vote, well short of the 75% required for election, but above the 5% minimum required to remain on the ballot. In 2024, his tenth and final appearance on the BBWAA ballot, he received 63.9%, falling short of the necessary threshold.

== Steroid allegations ==
During a workout with Barry Bonds in 2001, a cream was applied to Sheffield's knee by a trainer to help heal ripped stitches from a knee surgery. Sheffield states in his book, Inside Power, that he had no knowledge of the cream containing steroids, and had no reason to assume so at the time. He goes on to say in his book that the cream did nothing to strengthen his knee, and also states that a look at his numbers shows no improvement after the incident.

On December 13, 2007, Sheffield was named in the Mitchell Report as one of the players who had obtained and used steroids. Sheffield agreed to meet with the report's investigators for an interview but, due to the unavailability of his attorney, no interview could be scheduled before the report was published.

In their book Game of Shadows, reporters Mark Fainaru-Wada and Lance Williams allege that Sheffield worked with and received steroids such as testosterone and human growth hormone from his and Barry Bonds's personal trainer Greg Anderson. The book also details steroid calendars found in possession of Anderson outlining numerous steroid cycles Sheffield was to have undertaken after the 2001 season.

== Personal life ==
In 1986, Sheffield was arrested alongside his uncle, Dwight Gooden, and fellow Tampa baseball player Vance Lovelace and charged with violently resisting arrest and battery on a police officer. He pleaded no contest in January 1987 and was sentenced to two years probation.

In October 1987, while still on probation, Sheffield was arrested and charged with driving while intoxicated and related offenses. Those charges were eventually consolidated into one reckless driving charge. His probation was extended for an additional 18 months.

On December 5, 1993, Sheffield was arrested after being clocked driving a Ferrari Testarossa 110 miles per hour (180 km/h) on Interstate 4 in Florida and failing a breathalyzer test. In May 1994, he pleaded no contest to reckless driving and was sentenced again to nine months of probation and 40 hours of community service.

In October 1995, Sheffield was shot in his left shoulder after an attempted robbery when he stopped his car at a traffic light in Tampa.

Throughout his career, Sheffield was verbal about his need for sufficient financial compensation and respect, demanding better pay when he was with the Dodgers, and refusing to play in the inaugural World Baseball Classic, saying the regular "season is when [he's] getting paid."

Sheffield and his wife Deleon reside in Tampa, Florida. They have three sons Jaden Sheffield, Noah Sheffield, and Christian Sheffield. Sheffield has five other children from previous relationships. Deleon is a gospel recording artist and has sung the National Anthem at Yankee Stadium during a playoff game with Sheffield on the lineup. In February 2005, a man was arraigned in federal court on charges of extorting Sheffield by threatening to release a sex tape of Deleon with an ex-boyfriend. In January 2006, the man was sentenced to 27 months in prison.

Sheffield's cousin, Derrick Pedro, played outfield in the Milwaukee Brewers organization. Sheffield's cousin, Tim Carter, played professional football as a wide receiver.

In the June 2007 issue of GQ magazine, Sheffield (a Detroit Tiger at the time) was quoted saying that there are more Latin baseball players than African-American players because Latinos are easier to control. "What I said is that you're going to see more black faces, but there ain't no English going to be coming out. ... (It's about) being able to tell (Latin players) what to do — being able to control them.... Where I'm from, you can't control us." He continued "They have more to lose than we do. You can send them back across the island. You can't send us back. We're already here."

== See also ==
- List of Major League Baseball batting champions
- List of Major League Baseball career doubles leaders
- List of Major League Baseball career home run leaders
- List of Major League Baseball career hits leaders
- List of Major League Baseball career runs scored leaders
- List of Major League Baseball career runs batted in leaders
- List of Major League Baseball career stolen bases leaders
- List of Major League Baseball career total bases leaders
- List of Miami Marlins team records
- List of Major League Baseball players named in the Mitchell Report
- List of sportspeople sanctioned for doping offences

Preceded by Brett Butler	National League Player of the Month; August, 1992	Succeeded by Barry Bonds
