= José Martínez (pitcher) =

Dominican baseball player (born 1971)

- Pitcher
- Born: April 1, 1971 (age 54); Guayubín, Dominican Republic
- Batted: Right Threw: Right

MLB debut
- May 10, 1994, for the San Diego Padres

Last MLB appearance
- May 19, 1994, for the San Diego Padres

MLB statistics
- Win–loss record: 0–2
- Earned run average: 6.75
- Strikeouts: 7

CPBL statistics
- Win–loss record: 16–12
- Earned run average: 4.21
- Strikeouts: 105
- Stats at Baseball Reference

Teams
- San Diego Padres (1994); China Times Eagles (1996–1997)

José Miguel Martínez Martínez (born April 1, 1971) is a Dominican former professional baseball pitcher. He appeared in four games in Major League Baseball (MLB), for the San Diego Padres in 1994. He later played two seasons in the Chinese Professional Baseball League (CPBL).

== Biography ==
Martínez first played professionally in the farm system of the New York Mets, from 1989 through 1992.

Martínez was the second pick of the Florida Marlins in the 1992 MLB expansion draft, and played part of the 1993 season for the Edmonton Trappers, a Triple-A team in the Pacific Coast League (PCL). He was subsequently traded with Trevor Hoffman and Andres Berumen to the San Diego Padres for Gary Sheffield. Martínez finished the 1993 season with the Las Vegas Stars of the PCL.

Martínez was called up by the Padres from the Double-A Wichita Wranglers on May 10, 1994, to replace an injured Tim Mauser and make his major-league debut. He appeared in four games for San Diego (one start), compiling a 6.75 earned run average (ERA) and a 0–2 win–loss record. He remained in the Padres organization through the 1995 season.

Martínez played in Chinese Professional Baseball League (CPBL) of Taiwan during 1996 and 1997 for the China Times Eagles, appearing in 39 games (34 starts), compiling a 16–12 record with a 4.21 ERA. He did not play professionally after 1997.
