= 1993 Baltimore Orioles season =

Major League Baseball season

1993 Baltimore Orioles
- League: American League
- Division: East
- Ballpark: Oriole Park at Camden Yards
- City: Baltimore
- Record: 85–77 (.525)
- Divisional place: 3rd
- Owners: Peter Angelos
- General managers: Roland Hemond
- Managers: Johnny Oates
- Television: WMAR-TV/WDCA (Jon Miller, Brooks Robinson, Scott Garceau); Home Team Sports (Mel Proctor, John Lowenstein, Jim Palmer)
- Radio: WBAL (AM) (Chuck Thompson, Jon Miller, Fred Manfra)

The 1993 Baltimore Orioles season was the 93rd baseball season in Orioles history. It involved the Orioles finishing tied with the Detroit Tigers for third place in the American League East with a record of 85–77. They also hosted the 1993 Major League Baseball All-Star Game.

== Offseason ==
- December 7, 1992: Sherman Obando was drafted by the Orioles from the New York Yankees in the 1992 rule 5 draft.
- December 11, 1992: Billy Ripken was released by the Orioles.
- December 14, 1992: Scott Coolbaugh was signed as a free agent by the Orioles.

== Regular season ==
The Orioles hosted the 1993 Major League Baseball All-Star Game. It was the 64th playing of the midsummer classic between the all-stars of the American League (AL) and National League (NL) at Oriole Park at Camden Yards. The game resulted in the American League defeating the National League 9–3. Orioles pitcher Mike Mussina was voted onto the All-Star team, but did not pitch in the game due to his injury.

There was a controversial incident towards the end of the game when Mussina chose to warm-up in the bullpen, despite the fact AL manager Cito Gaston had told him prior to the game that he would not pitch during the contest because of his injury issues and in case the game went into extra innings. Orioles fans believed Mussina was warming up in preparation to come in and pitch the ninth inning and when Gaston put Duane Ward in to pitch the ninth inning, the fans at Camden Yards spent the rest of the game booing Gaston very loudly and many chanted the popular slogan saying "Cito Sucks" which could be heard years later in Baltimore anytime Baltimore played Toronto. Gaston was never treated well by Baltimore fans for the rest of his managerial career and he was subject to death threats for not pitching Mussina in the game. Many believe Mussina threw on his own as a way of publicly showing up Gaston because he was angry at not pitching in the game.

=== Season standings ===
AL East
Team	W	L	Pct.	GB	Home	Road
Toronto Blue Jays	95	67	.586	—	48‍–‍33	47‍–‍34
New York Yankees	88	74	.543	7	50‍–‍31	38‍–‍43
Baltimore Orioles	85	77	.525	10	48‍–‍33	37‍–‍44
Detroit Tigers	85	77	.525	10	44‍–‍37	41‍–‍40
Boston Red Sox	80	82	.494	15	43‍–‍38	37‍–‍44
Cleveland Indians	76	86	.469	19	46‍–‍35	30‍–‍51
Milwaukee Brewers	69	93	.426	26	38‍–‍43	31‍–‍50

=== Record vs. opponents ===
1993 American League record Source: MLB Standings Grid – 1993
Team	BAL	BOS	CAL	CWS	CLE	DET	KC	MIL	MIN	NYY	OAK	SEA	TEX	TOR
Baltimore	—	6–7	7–5	4–8	8–5	5–8	7–5	8–5	8–4	6–7	10–2	7–5	4–8	5–8
Boston	7–6	—	7–5	7–5	5–8	6–7	5–7	5–8	7–5	6–7	9–3	7–5	6–6	3–10
California	5–7	5–7	—	7–6	5–7	4–8	6–7	7–5	4–9	6–6	6–7	6–7	6–7	4–8
Chicago	8–4	5–7	6–7	—	9–3	7–5	6–7	9–3	10–3	4–8	7–6	9–4	8–5	6–6
Cleveland	5–8	8–5	7–5	3–9	—	6–7	7–5	8–5	4–8	6–7	8–4	3–9	7–5	4–9
Detroit	8–5	7–6	8–4	5–7	7–6	—	5–7	8–5	6–6	4–9	8–4	7–5	6–6	6–7
Kansas City	5–7	7–5	7–6	7–6	5–7	7–5	—	5–7	7–6	6–6	6–7	7–6	7–6	8–4
Milwaukee	5–8	8–5	5–7	3–9	5–8	5–8	7–5	—	7–5	4–9	7–5	4–8	4–8	5–8
Minnesota	4–8	5–7	9–4	3–10	8–4	6–6	6–7	5–7	—	4–8	8–5	4–9	7–6	2–10
New York	7–6	7–6	6–6	8–4	7–6	9–4	6–6	9–4	8–4	—	6–6	7–5	3–9	5–8
Oakland	2–10	3–9	7–6	6–7	4–8	4–8	7–6	5–7	5–8	6–6	—	9–4	5–8	5–7
Seattle	5–7	5–7	7–6	4–9	9–3	5–7	6–7	8–4	9–4	5–7	4–9	—	8–5	7–5
Texas	8–4	6–6	7–6	5–8	5–7	6–6	6–7	8–4	6–7	9–3	8–5	5–8	—	7–5
Toronto	8–5	10–3	8–4	6–6	9–4	7–6	4–8	8–5	10–2	8–5	7–5	5–7	5–7	—

=== Notable transactions ===
- June 29, 1993: Mike Bielecki was signed as a free agent by the Orioles.
- August 15, 1993: Mike Bielecki was released by the Orioles.
- September 30, 1993: Scott Coolbaugh was released by the Orioles.

=== Roster ===
1993 Baltimore Orioles
Roster
Pitchers: 55 Mike Cook; 49 Todd Frohwirth; 19 Ben McDonald; 48 Kevin McGehee; 75 Alan Mills; 51 Jamie Moyer; 35 Mike Mussina; 46 John O'Donoghue; 30 Gregg Olson; 47 Brad Pennington; 45 Jim Poole; 53 Arthur Rhodes; 40 Rick Sutcliffe; 50 Anthony Telford; 34 Fernando Valenzuela; 32 Mark Williamson	Catchers: 23 Chris Hoiles; 6 Mark Parent; 41 Jeff Tackett; Infielders: 88 Paul Carey; 27 Glenn Davis; 10 Leo Gómez; 36 Tim Hulett; 13 Mike Pagliarulo; 6,25 Harold Reynolds; 8 Cal Ripken Jr.; 21 David Segui	Outfielders: 9 Brady Anderson; 18 Damon Buford; 12 Mike Devereaux; 11 Jeffrey Hammonds; 38 Mark Leonard; 14 Chito Martínez; 2 Mark McLemore; 11 Luis Mercedes; 42 Sherman Obando; 27 Lonnie Smith; 28 Jack Voigt; Other batters: 1 Manny Alexander; 3 Harold Baines	Manager: 26 Johnny Oates; Coaches: 25,24 Greg Biagini (Hitting); 17 Dick Bosman (Pitching); 43 Mike Ferraro (Third base); 44 Elrod Hendricks (Bullpen); 15 Davey Lopes (First base); 31 Jerry Narron (Bench)

== Player stats ==
=== Batting ===
==== Starters by position ====
Note: Pos = Position; G = Games played; AB = At bats; R = Runs scored; H = Hits; 2B = Doubles; 3B = Triples; HR = Home runs; RBI = Runs batted in; AVG = Batting average; SB = Stolen bases

Pos	Player	G	AB	R	H	2B	3B	HR	RBI	AVG	SB
C	Chris Hoiles	126	419	80	130	28	0	29	82	.310	1
1B	David Segui	146	450	54	123	27	0	10	60	.273	2
2B	Harold Reynolds	145	485	64	122	20	4	4	47	.252	12
3B	Leo Gómez	71	244	30	48	7	0	10	25	.197	0
SS	Cal Ripken Jr.	162	641	87	165	26	3	24	90	.257	1
LF	Brady Anderson	142	560	87	147	36	8	13	66	.263	24
CF	Mike Devereaux	131	527	72	132	31	3	14	75	.250	3
RF	Mark McLemore	148	581	81	165	27	5	4	72	.284	21
DH	Harold Baines	118	416	64	130	22	0	20	78	.313	0

==== Other batters ====
Note: G = Games played; AB = At bats; R = Runs scored; H = Hits; 2B = Doubles; 3B = Triples; HR = Home runs; RBI = Runs batted in; AVG = Batting average; SB = Stolen bases

Player	G	AB	R	H	2B	3B	HR	RBI	AVG	SB
Tim Hulett	85	260	40	78	15	0	2	23	.300	1
Jack Voigt	64	152	32	45	11	1	6	23	.296	1
Mike Pagliarulo	33	117	24	38	9	0	6	21	.325	0
Glenn Davis	30	113	8	20	3	0	1	9	.177	0
Jeffrey Hammonds	33	105	10	32	8	0	3	19	.305	4
Sherman Obando	31	92	8	25	2	0	3	15	.272	0
Jeff Tackett	38	87	8	15	3	0	0	9	.172	0
Damon Buford	53	79	18	18	5	0	2	9	.228	2
Mark Parent	22	54	7	14	2	0	4	12	.259	0
Paul Carey	18	47	1	10	1	0	0	3	.213	0
Luis Mercedes	10	24	1	7	2	0	0	1	.292	1
Lonnie Smith	9	24	8	5	1	0	2	3	.208	0
Mark Leonard	10	15	1	1	1	0	0	3	.067	0
Chito Martínez	8	15	0	0	0	0	0	0	.000	0
Manny Alexander	3	0	1	0	0	0	0	0	.---	0

=== Pitching ===
==== Starting pitchers ====
Note: W = Wins; L = Losses; ERA = Earned run average; G = Games pitched; GS = Games started; IP = Innings pitched; R = Runs allowed; ER = Earned runs allowed; BB = Walks allowed; K = Strikeouts

Player	W	L	ERA	G	GS	IP	R	ER	BB	K
Ben McDonald	13	14	3.39	34	34	220.1	92	83	86	171
Fernando Valenzuela	8	10	4.94	32	31	178.2	104	98	79	78
Mike Mussina	14	6	4.46	25	25	167.2	84	83	44	117
Rick Sutcliffe	10	10	5.75	29	28	166.0	112	106	74	80
Jamie Moyer	12	9	3.43	25	25	152.0	63	58	38	90
Arthur Rhodes	5	6	6.51	17	17	85.2	62	62	49	49

==== Relief pitchers ====
Note: W = Wins; L = Losses; ERA = Earned run average; G = Games pitched; SV = Saves; IP = Innings pitched; R = Runs allowed; ER = Earned runs allowed; BB = Walks allowed; K = Strikeouts

Player	W	L	ERA	G	SV	IP	R	ER	BB	K
Gregg Olson	0	2	1.60	50	29	45.0	9	8	18	44
Alan Mills	5	4	3.23	45	4	100.1	39	36	51	68
Todd Frohwirth	6	7	3.83	70	3	96.1	47	41	44	50
Mark Williamson	7	5	4.91	48	0	88.0	54	48	25	45
Jim Poole	2	1	2.15	55	2	50.1	18	12	21	29
Brad Pennington	3	2	6.55	34	4	33.0	25	24	25	39
John O'Donoghue	0	1	4.58	11	0	19.2	12	10	10	16
Kevin McGehee	0	0	5.94	5	0	16.2	11	11	7	7
Mike Oquist	0	0	3.86	5	0	11.2	5	5	4	8
Anthony Telford	0	0	9.82	3	0	7.1	8	8	1	6
Mike Cook	0	0	0.00	2	0	3.0	0	0	2	3
Jeff Tackett	0	0	0.00	1	0	1.0	0	0	1	0

== Awards and honors ==
All-Star Game

- Cal Ripken Jr., SS, Starter
- Mike Mussina, Pitcher, Reserve
- Johnny Oates, First Base Coach

== Farm system ==
Level	Team	League	Manager
AAA	Rochester Red Wings	International League	Bobby Miscik
AA	Bowie Baysox	Eastern League	Don Buford
A	Frederick Keys	Carolina League	Pete Mackanin
A	Albany Polecats	South Atlantic League	Mike O'Berry
Rookie	Bluefield Orioles	Appalachian League	Andy Etchebarren
Rookie	GCL Orioles	Gulf Coast League	Oneri Fleita
