= Mike Flanagan (baseball) =

American baseball player (1951–2011)

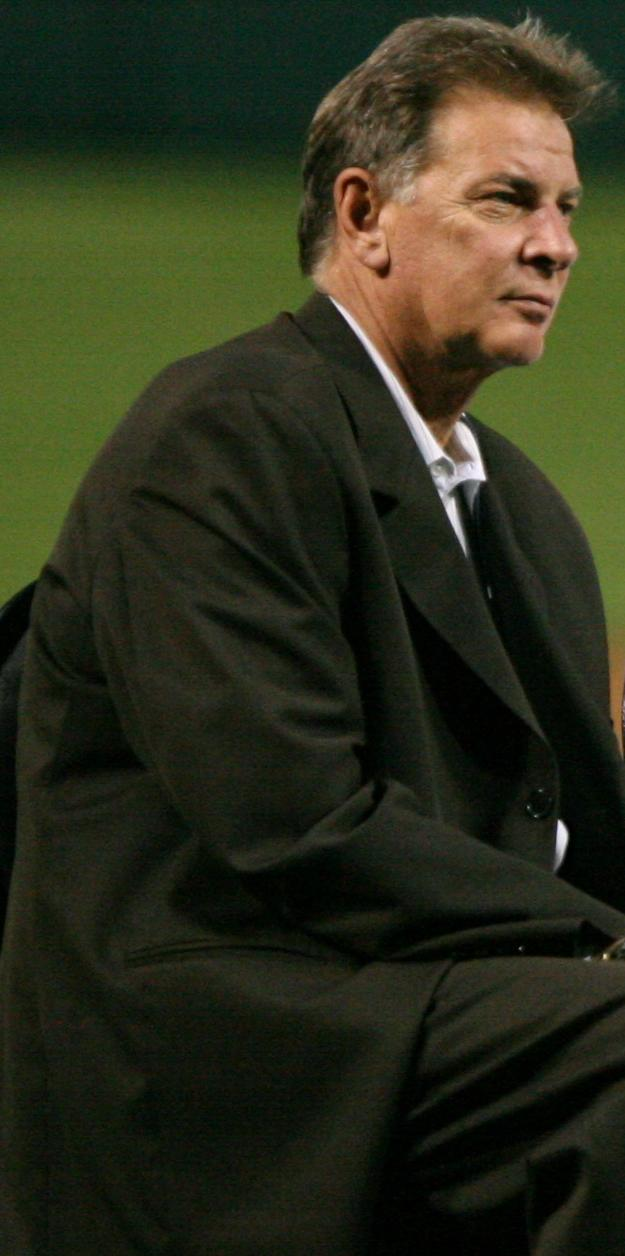
- Flanagan in 2007
- Pitcher
- Born: December 16, 1951; Manchester, New Hampshire, U.S.
- Died: August 24, 2011 (aged 59); Sparks, Maryland, U.S.
- Batted: Left Threw: Left

MLB debut
- September 5, 1975, for the Baltimore Orioles

Last MLB appearance
- September 27, 1992, for the Baltimore Orioles

MLB statistics
- Win–loss record: 167–143
- Earned run average: 3.90
- Strikeouts: 1,491
- Stats at Baseball Reference

Teams
- Baltimore Orioles (1975–1987); Toronto Blue Jays (1987–1990); Baltimore Orioles (1991–1992)

Career highlights and awards
- All-Star (1978); World Series champion (1983); AL Cy Young Award (1979); MLB wins leader (1979); Pitched a combined no-hitter on July 13, 1991; Baltimore Orioles Hall of Fame

Michael Kendall Flanagan (December 16, 1951 – August 24, 2011) was an American professional baseball left-handed pitcher, front office executive, and color commentator. He spent 18 years as a player in Major League Baseball (MLB) with the Baltimore Orioles (1975–1987, 1991–1992) and the Toronto Blue Jays (1987–1990).

Flanagan was a starting pitcher for the Orioles from 1975 through 1987. He was named to the American League (AL) All-Star Team once in 1978. In 1979, the first of two years he would play on an AL pennant winner, his 23 victories led the circuit and earned him the AL's Cy Young Award. He was a member of the Orioles' World Series Championship team in 1983. During the 1987 season, he was traded to the Toronto Blue Jays, with whom he pitched through 1990. He returned to Baltimore to close out his playing career as a relief pitcher in 1991 and 1992. During this second tour, he combined with three other pitchers to throw a no-hitter against the Oakland Athletics on July 13, 1991. He was also the last Orioles pitcher to appear in a major-league contest at Memorial Stadium. In an 18-season career, Flanagan posted a 167–143 record with 1,491 strikeouts and a 3.90 earned run average in 2,770 innings pitched.

He served in three different positions with the Orioles after his retirement as an active player. He was the pitching coach in 1995 and 1998 and the executive vice president of baseball operations from 2006 through 2008. At the time of his death, he was one of the team's broadcasters, a role he had previously held three times (1994, 1996–1997, and 1999–2002).

== Early years ==
Born and raised in Manchester, New Hampshire, Mike was one of four children born to Ed and Lorraine Flanagan, the younger of their two sons. His grandfather, Ed Sr., had been a pitcher in the Boston Braves organization who could throw with both hands, and his father Ed had played minor league ball in the Boston Red Sox and Detroit Tigers systems. Ed died on December 13, 2020. Under their tutelage, Flanagan once struck out 18 batters in a six inning Little League game.

Flanagan graduated from Manchester (NH) Memorial High School, where he was on the baseball and basketball teams that each won consecutive New Hampshire Interscholastic Athletic Association (NHIAA) Class L titles in 1970 and 1971. His pitching was limited in 1971 because of a left elbow injury he had sustained while playing American Legion Baseball for the local Henry J. Sweeney Post the previous summer. This factored into him not signing a contract after he was picked by the Houston Astros in the 15th round (346th overall) of the 1971 Major League Baseball (MLB) draft.

== University of Massachusetts ==
Flanagan attended the University of Massachusetts (UMass), where he played baseball for the Minutemen in 1972 and 1973. He was a first-team All-Yankee Conference and first team All-New England selection in 1973, when he posted a 9–1 record with a 1.72 earned run average and 89 strikeouts, leading the Yankee Conference in all three categories. (Note: UMass's Hall of Fame website says his earned run average was 1.52 that year and that he had 91 strikeouts.) His .900 winning percentage was the best school single-season mark until Scott Meaney had a 6–0 record in 1990. Flanagan had a career earned run average of 1.19 and a career winning percentage of .923 (12–1), which are both still the best marks in school history. In addition to pitching for UMass, Flanagan played in the outfield. Offensively, he batted .320 in 128 at bats with six home runs and 29 runs batted in.

As a freshman, Flanagan played basketball at UMass on the same Freshmen team as Rick Pitino. Flanagan and Pitino crossed paths with Julius Erving, who was a junior on the Varsity at the time. Flanagan said, "I really didn't know much about Dr. J until I came down on a fast break and pulled up to take a jump shot. Dr. J was nowhere in the area but, out of nowhere, he blocked the shot and nine players were running the other way. First thing I thought? Better work on my slider, because this is a whole different level of play." He received his degree from the UMass College of Education in 1975, and he was inducted into the UMass Athletic Hall of Fame in 2000.

He was a pitcher and outfielder for the Falmouth Commodores in the Cape Cod Baseball League (CCBL) during the summer of 1972. On the mound, he had a 7–1 record and a 2.18 ERA, while at the plate he batted .286 with 7 home runs. He was a member of the CCBL's inaugural Hall of Fame class in 2000.

== Professional career ==
=== Baltimore Orioles (1975–1987) ===
==== Breaking into the big leagues (1975–1976) ====
Flanagan was selected again in the 1973 MLB draft, this time by the Baltimore Orioles in the 7th round (159th overall). When he signed with the Orioles, the ball club agreed to finance the remainder of his college education. He progressed through the organization, with stops at Class A Miami (1973–1974), Class AA Asheville (1974), and Class AAA Rochester, where he went 13–4 with a 2.50 earned run average in 1975.

His MLB career began with two appearances against the New York Yankees in the last month of the 1975 campaign. He made his debut pitching 1 2/3 innings in relief of starter Wayne Garland in a 5–4 victory in the opener of a twi-night doubleheader at Memorial Stadium on September 5. His first start and decision was a 3–2 loss at Shea Stadium in the nightcap of another twin bill 23 days later on September 28 which was the final game of the regular season. He was on the verge of a shutout until the bottom of the ninth when the first three batters he faced reached base and Dyar Miller allowed all of them to score on a single and an error.

Flanagan's 1976 campaign was split between Rochester and Baltimore. He did not get his first Major League win until a 7–1 complete-game triumph at home over the eventual American League (AL) West champion Kansas City Royals on September 1. In 20 games (10 starts), he had a 3–5 record, a 4.13 ERA, 56 strikeouts, 33 walks, and 83 hits allowed in 85 innings pitched.

==== Full-time starter and All-Star (1977–1978) ====
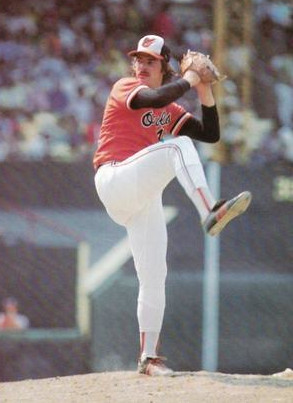
Flanagan in 1977

By 1977, Flanagan was serving as a starting pitcher full-time; the season was the first of four straight in which he would pitch at least 230 innings. On May 14, he threw his first career shutout, holding the Oakland Athletics to five hits in a 2–0 victory at the Oakland–Alameda County Coliseum. He had 13 strikeouts on September 27 when the Orioles defeated the Detroit Tigers 6–1. In 36 games (33 starts), he had a 15–10 record, a 3.64 ERA, 149 strikeouts, 70 walks, and 235 hits allowed in 235 innings.

In 1978, Flanagan was the Orioles' Opening Day starter, the only year from 1974 through 1980 that Jim Palmer did not make the Opening Day start for Baltimore. Flanagan had a 10–1 record from May 5 through June 22, 1978, including a six-game winning streak from May 31 through June 22. He was selected to his only All-Star Game in 1978 after posting a 12–6 record and a 3.16 earned run average before the All-Star Break. Three times he pitch over nine innings in a game: 11 on June 13 in a 3–2 victory over the Seattle Mariners, 11 on July 17 in a 2–0 loss to the Texas Rangers, and 9 2/3 on September 22 in a 7–5 loss to the Tigers. He was not quite as effective in the second part of the season. His record was just 7–9 and his earned run average was 4.60. Towards the end of the season, on September 26, he was one out away from pitching a no-hitter against the Cleveland Indians, with the Orioles leading 3–0. Then, Gary Alexander hit a home run. After the next two batters singled, bringing the potential go-ahead run to the plate, manager Earl Weaver replaced Flanagan with Don Stanhouse, who struck out the next hitter to preserve the victory. Flanagan was a workhorse for the Orioles in 1978, tying with Dennis Leonard for the AL lead with 40 games started and ranking fourth in the AL with 281 1/3 innings pitched (behind teammate Palmer's 296, Leonard's 294 2/3, and Mike Caldwell's 293 1/3), though he also led the AL in earned runs allowed with 126. His 19 wins were tied with Paul Splittorff for seventh in the AL, and he also tied with four others for fifth in the AL with 15 losses. He had a 4.03 earned run average and ranked fourth in the AL with 167 strikeouts (behind Nolan Ryan's 260, Ron Guidry's 248, and Leonard's 183).

==== Cy Young Award winner (1979) ====
After posting a 12–6 record and a 4.05 earned run average before the All-Star break in 1979, Flanagan posted a 12–3 record and a 2.15 earned run average in the latter part of the season. From July 9 through September 13, the Orioles only lost one game he pitched, an outing against the Yankees where Flanagan allowed three runs in a complete game but Tommy John allowed only two for New York. Flanagan posted a 12–1 record over 15 games during the stretch. In the second game of a doubleheader against the Toronto Blue Jays on September 1, Flanagan allowed one run and seven hits in a complete game, 5–1 victory, becoming the first pitcher in the major leagues to win 20 games in 1979. After the game, pitching coach Ray Miller suggested that Flanagan's fastball was underrated, claiming that only five pitchers had thrown a harder one all year. Flanagan credited some of his success to learning how to throw a changeup; Scott McGregor taught him the pitch that season.

The 1979 season proved to be Flanagan's best, as he finished the year with a record of 23–9 and an earned run average of 3.08. He led the AL with 23 wins and five shutouts (tying for the latter with Ryan and Leonard), also ranking among AL leaders with a 3.08 earned run average (fourth behind Ron Guidry's 2.78, John's 2.96, and Dennis Eckersley's 2.99), 190 strikeouts (third behind Ryan's 223 and Guidry's 201), and 265 2/3 innings pitched (third behind teammate Dennis Martínez's 292 1/3 and John's 276 1/3). He won the Cy Young Award and the Sporting News AL Pitcher of the Year Award, also finishing sixth in AL Most Valuable Player (MVP) voting as the Orioles won the AL East.

Palmer tried to convince Weaver to start Flanagan instead of him in Game 1 of the AL Championship Series (ALCS) against the California Angels, but Weaver insisted on going with the more experienced Palmer in a game the Orioles ultimately won 6–3 in 10 innings. The starter for Game 2, Flanagan held the Angels to three runs through seven innings before getting pulled in the top of the eighth after the first three runners reached (though Rod Carew did so on an error). He was charged with six runs (four earned) in seven innings but picked up the win in Baltimore's 9–8 victory; Baltimore defeated the Angels in four games. Flanagan started Game 1 of the World Series, allowing four runs to the Pittsburgh Pirates but pitching the whole game in Baltimore's 5–4 triumph. In Game 5, he threw shutout baseball for the first five innings but allowed two runs in the sixth as the Orioles fell behind 2–1. When Rick Dempsey doubled with two outs in the seventh inning, Weaver opted to pinch hit for Flanagan with Pat Kelly, in hopes of getting a run. Kelly struck out, and the Orioles went on to lose 7–1, with Flanagan taking the loss. Flanagan also was one of five pitchers the Orioles used in the ninth inning of Game 7. He gave up a single to the only batter he faced, Omar Moreno, who later scored as Pittsburgh went on to win the game 4–1 and the series 4–3. After Flanagan's season ended, on November 10, his hometown of Manchester honored him with "Mike Flanagan Day", in which he was escorted through town in a motorcade to the applause of over 1,000 spectators.

==== New contract & World Series victor (1980–1983) ====
Against the Tigers on September 17, 1980, Flanagan was called for a balk, which led to one of Weaver's most infamous tirades. After arguing with the umpire for about a dozen minutes, Weaver returned to the dugout and told Flanagan it was a bad call, to which Flanagan responded that he had indeed balked. The Orioles still won the game 9–3. Although his earned run average was more than one run higher for the team in 1980, he had a winning record once again. In 37 games (all starts), he had a 16–13 record, a 4.12 ERA, 128 strikeouts, and 71 walks. He was eighth in the AL with 251 1/3 innings pitched but led the league in hits allowed with 278.

The 1981 Major League Baseball strike resulted in the cancellation of games in June and July. Flanagan's season was further interrupted in September, when tendonitis ended his streak of 157 scheduled starts made. "It's just an oil change and a 30,000-inning checkup," he told reporters. In 20 games (all starts), he had a 9–6 record, a 4.19 ERA, 72 strikeouts, 37 walks, and 108 hits allowed in 116 innings.

Prior to the 1982 season, Flanagan and the Orioles went to arbitration concerning his contract for the year. Unusually, Flanagan's requested price ($485,000 a year) was lower than the team's requested price ($500,000 a year), as the Orioles were not sure how much money he would be requesting. Flanagan accepted their offer in a five-year contract with an option for a sixth year. With no interruptions to his season this time, he was again able to pitch over 200 innings, with 236 thrown. In 36 games (35 starts), he had a 15–11 record, a 3.97 ERA, 103 strikeouts, and 76 walks in 36 games (35 starts).

Flanagan's 1983 season started strong, as he won his first six decisions, culminating in a seven-hit shutout of the Seattle Mariners on May 11. However, he suffered a major injury in the first inning of the opener of a doubleheader against the Chicago White Sox on May 17, twisting his left knee. The injury kept him out of action until August 7 and kept his knee in a brace until May 24, 1984. Still, Flanagan won five games in a row from August 28 through September 17 as Baltimore won the AL East title. In 20 games (all starts), he had a 12–4 record, a 3.30 ERA, 50 strikeouts, 31 walks, and 135 hits allowed in 125 1/3 innings pitched. His .750 winning percentage was third in the AL, behind Moose Haas's .813 and Richard Dotson's .759.

In Game 3 of the ALCS against the White Sox, Flanagan held the team to one run before getting replaced by Sammy Stewart in the sixth inning with his team up 6–1. He was awarded the victory in the 11–1 triumph, and Baltimore went on to defeat Chicago in four games. He started Game 3 of the World Series against the Philadelphia Phillies, giving up solo home runs to Gary Matthews and Joe Morgan before getting pinch-hit for by Ken Singleton in the fifth inning, as Baltimore had a man on second with two outs and a chance to score its first run against Steve Carlton. Singleton struck out, but the Orioles went on to win 3–2 before eventually winning the series in five games. Though 1979 was his best season statistically, Flanagan considered the World Championship campaign of 1983 as his best year in baseball.

==== Last effective year with the Orioles and injuries (1984–1987) ====
The 1984 season would be Flanagan's last effective one with the Orioles. A three-hit shutout of the Royals in the second game of a doubleheader propelled his record to 9–6, but he lost his next five starts. Through August 18, he had a 9–11 record. Starting August 19, he posted a 4–2 record and a 3.57 earned run average over the remainder of the year to finish the season at 13–13. In 34 games (all starts), he had a 3.53 ERA, 115 strikeouts, 81 walks, and 213 hits allowed in 226 2/3 innings. It was the last season in which he would record at least 100 strikeouts.

On January 24, 1985, Flanagan suffered another major injury, tearing his left Achilles tendon during a charity basketball game. The injury kept him out until July. In 15 starts, he had a 4–5 record, a 5.13 ERA, 42 strikeouts, 28 walks, and 101 hits allowed in 86 innings pitched.

Eight years after his first, Flanagan made his only other Opening Day start for the Orioles in 1986. His 1986 and 1987 campaigns were both affected by a return of his elbow tendonitis, which cost him four starts in 1986 and two months in 1987. In 29 games (28 starts) in 1986, he had a 7–11 record, a 4.24 ERA, 96 strikeouts, 66 walks, and 179 hits allowed in 172 innings pitched. Through the end of August 1987, he was 3–6 with a 4.94 ERA, though he was 3–1 with a 3.71 earned run average since returning from the tendonitis injury.

=== Toronto Blue Jays (1987–1990) ===
Flanagan had been quite successful against Toronto in his career, as his 17–10 record was the best of any pitcher against the franchise since they were created in 1977. He was traded from the Orioles to the Toronto Blue Jays for Oswaldo Peraza on August 31, 1987, in a transaction that was completed four days later on September 4 when José Mesa was sent to Baltimore. When Flanagan joined the Blue Jays, the team released Phil Niekro to make room for him on their roster. His most memorable performance with the Blue Jays took place at Tiger Stadium on October 3, 1987, the penultimate game of the regular season. With Toronto in a first-place tie with Detroit and having lost its last five contests, Flanagan outlasted Jack Morris by pitching 11 innings before departing with the match deadlocked at 2–2. The Blue Jays ended up losing the game 3–2 one inning later and the AL East championship the following afternoon. Morris said after the game, "Flanagan was so great, so competitive, that I considered my job to be survival – somehow keep us tied until he left the game. We weren't going to get to the playoffs beating him, we could only get there surviving him." In seven games (all starts) for the Blue Jays in 1987, he had a 3–2 record and a 2.37 ERA. His combined stats between Baltimore and Toronto that season were a 6–8 record, a 4.06 ERA, 93 strikeouts, 51 walks, and 148 hits allowed in 144 innings over 23 games (all starts).

Against the Tigers on June 26, 1988, Flanagan won his 150th game, holding Detroit to one run over eight innings in a 4–1 victory. Healthy all season, he pitched 211 innings, topping the 200-inning mark for the first time since 1984 and last time in his career. He also won 10 or more games for the eighth and last time in his career. In 34 games (all starts), he had a 13–13 record, a 4.18 ERA, 99 strikeouts, 80 walks, and 220 hits allowed.

Though his record was only 6–6, Flanagan had a 3.33 earned run average for the Blue Jays through July 21, 1989. Thereafter, he posted a 5.02 ERA, going 2–4. In 30 games (all starts), he had an 8–10 record, a 3.93 ERA, 47 strikeouts, 47 walks, and 186 hits allowed in 171 2/3 innings. Even though he had a losing record, the Blue Jays won the AL East, and Flanagan had his only postseason experience with the Blue Jays. Starting Game 4 in the ALCS against the Athletics, he pitched 4 1/3 innings, giving up five runs and three home runs. One of the latter was Jose Canseco's 480-foot (146.30 meters) shot in the third inning, which was the first home run to land in the top deck of the SkyDome. He took the loss in the game, and the Athletics went on to win the series in five games.

Flanagan's final appearance with Toronto was a start that resulted in a 3–1 loss at home to the Tigers on May 4, 1990, as he surrendered all 3 runs in 4 1/3 innings. He was released on May 8. In five starts, he had posted a 2–2 record, a 5.31 ERA, five strikeouts, eight walks, and 28 hits allowed in 20 1/3 innings pitched. His overall record with the Blue Jays was 26–27. He did not pitch again that season, instead thinking about what he wanted to do next.

=== Second stint with the Baltimore Orioles (1991–1992) ===
After being invited to Oriole training camp on a minor league contract in 1991, Flanagan made the team as a relief pitcher. His best moment as a reliever came on July 13 against Oakland. He was called to the plate in the seventh inning after starter Bob Milacki, who had thrown six no-hit innings, was struck by a line drive and had to leave the game. Flanagan walked one but pitched a hitless seventh, middle reliever Mark Williamson pitched a hitless eighth, and closer Gregg Olson pitched a hitless ninth, giving the four a combined no-hitter. On September 27, manager Johnny Oates brought him in to record the last two outs by an Oriole pitcher in the final baseball game played at Memorial Stadium, a 7–1 loss to the Tigers. In 64 games (just one of which was a start), he had a 2–7 record, a 2.38 ERA, 55 strikeouts, 25 walks, and 84 hits allowed in 98 1/3 innings. He also recorded three saves, giving him a total of four in his career, as he had previously recorded one in 1977.

Baltimore's first season at Oriole Park at Camden Yards, 1992, was Flanagan's last. He appeared in his final game on September 27, pitching two scoreless innings in a 6–1 loss to the Red Sox. In 42 games, all in relief, he had no record, an 8.05 ERA, 17 strikeouts, 23 walks, and 50 hits allowed in 34 2/3 innings.

== Legacy ==
In an 18-season career, Flanagan posted a 167–143 record with a 3.90 ERA, 1,491 strikeouts, 890 walks, and 2,806 hits allowed in 2,770 innings pitched. He ranks among the Orioles' all-time leaders in many categories. His 143 wins rank fourth (behind Palmer's 268, Dave McNally's 181, and Mike Mussina's 147) and his 1,297 strikeouts rank fourth (behind Palmer's 2,212, Mussina's 1,535, and McNally's 1,476). He is third with 328 games started (behind Palmer's 521 and McNally's 384) and third with 2,317 2/3 innings pitched (behind Palmer's 3,948 and McNally's 2,652 2/3). Flanagan also ranks 10th with 98 complete games and 17 shutouts. Among the franchise's single-season record-holders, his 23 wins in 1979 are tied with Mike Cuellar's 1969 total and Palmer's 1975 total for sixth-best and his 40 starts in 1978 are tied with several others for first. The Orioles inducted Flanagan into their Hall of Fame in 1994.

=== Sense of humor ===
Flanagan was noted for his sense of humor, especially when it involved using puns to create nicknames. In his baseball column in the Sunday issues of The Boston Globe during the late-1970s, Peter Gammons ran a regular feature called the "Mike Flanagan Nickname of the Week". One example was John "Clams" Castino, which was a play on clams casino. Another was "Mordecai Six Toe" Lezcano, based on Mordecai "Three Finger" Brown and given to Sixto Lezcano. When the Blue Jays allowed Tony Solaita to sign with the Nippon-Ham Fighters after the 1979 campaign, he was dubbed "Tony Obsolaita". During the 1980 season, Flanagan called himself "Cy Young", Jim Palmer "Cy Old", Steve Stone "Cy Present" and Scott McGregor "Cy Future". When Storm Davis, whose pitching motion resembled Palmer's, joined the Orioles two years later in 1982, he was "Cy Clone". Flanagan added that pitchers became "Cy-bex" if they were injured and "Cy-onara" when they were no longer effective. Two monikers that stuck were "Full Pack" and "Stan the Man Unusual", both of which were coined for Don Stanhouse; the former nickname referred to the relief pitcher's causing manager Earl Weaver to smoke a full pack of cigarettes while Stanhouse was pitching, and the latter nickname was a play on "Stan the Man" Musial's nickname. This nickname concept was later popularized by ESPN's Chris Berman, who was inspired by the feature in Gammons' column.

== Post-playing days ==
After his playing career ended, Flanagan remained involved with the Orioles in various capacities. His career as a color commentator on Orioles telecasts began when he made broadcasts for Home Team Sports (HTS) in 1994. In 1995, he served as the Orioles pitching coach under manager Phil Regan. After that, he was appointed by HTS as the color commentator alongside Mel Proctor in early January 1996, following the controversial dismissal of John Lowenstein, a former Oriole teammate of Flanagan's. He also teamed with Michael Reghi in 1997. In 1998, he was succeeded by Rick Cerone as he again became the pitching coach for the Orioles, this time under Miller.

Flanagan rejoined Reghi in the broadcast booth in 1999. He continued as a commentator through the 2002 season, during which HTS evolved into Comcast SportsNet Mid-Atlantic. After the 2002 season, Buck Martinez was hired as a broadcaster, as Flanagan and Jim Beattie were named co-vice presidents of baseball operations for the Orioles in December 2002. When Beattie was dismissed following the 2005 season, Flanagan became the Orioles' executive vice president of baseball operations, a position equal to the status of general manager. He served in this role until 2007, when Andy MacPhail replaced him as the team's top executive. Flanagan remained with the team in a lesser capacity until his contract expired after the 2008 season.

In 2010, Flanagan went back behind the microphone, joining the Mid-Atlantic Sports Network (MASN) as the Orioles' secondary analyst after Martinez became the Blue Jays' lead broadcaster on Rogers Sportsnet. Both Flanagan and Palmer provided color commentary along with rotating play-by-play announcers Gary Thorne and Jim Hunter through the 2011 season.

== Pitching style ==
Flanagan's pitch selection included a slow curve, a heavy sinker, a fastball, and the changeup McGregor taught him in 1979. According to Rick Dempsey, who caught Flanagan with the Orioles, "On the days he didn't have good stuff, he just kept coming at you. He would change his rhythm, change his speed, drop down, throw a sidearm curveball—use every weapon in his arsenal to get you out. And then on the days when he had good stuff, you had no chance against him." His fastball was not one of baseball's fastest, but he compensated for this by relying on the other three pitches to win ballgames.

== Personal life ==
Flanagan married his first wife, Kathy Walsh, in January 1977. Their oldest daughter Kerry Ellen was the fourth American born through in vitro fertilization (IVF) and the first IVF baby not born by Caesarean section. The conception was performed at the Eastern Virginia Medical School. She was born at the Greater Baltimore Medical Center on July 9, 1982. Mike and Kathy had a second daughter, Kathryn "Katie" Kendall. Later, they divorced, and Mike married Alex Lynn Brienza, with whom he had a third daughter, Kendall.

== Death ==
When Flanagan's wife Alex did not hear from her husband on August 24, 2011, she phoned a neighbor for help. The neighbor went to the home and called 9-1-1 after failing to find him. Police discovered a body on the property but could not immediately determine the identity because the wounds were so severe. The body was later identified as Flanagan, with the cause of death determined to be a self-inflicted shotgun wound to the head.

Police said that Flanagan was distressed about financial issues. WBAL-TV reported that Flanagan was still despondent about his perceived failures during his tenure in the Orioles' front office. About one year after her husband's death, Alex Flanagan told Dan Rodricks of the Baltimore Sun that her husband had struggled with depression, seeing a therapist for over 20 years. She also said that he had an alcohol problem.

The Orioles wore a black patch bearing the text "Flanny" on the right sleeves of their jerseys for the rest of the 2011 season in tribute. After 2012, the Baltimore Orioles kept Flanagan's number 46 out of circulation until 2024, when it was worn by Craig Kimbrel. Jeremy Guthrie was previously the last player to wear the number in 2011.

== See also ==
- List of Major League Baseball annual wins leaders

== Notes ==
Preceded by Tommy Greene	No-hit game July 13, 1991 with Milacki, Williamson & Olson	Succeeded by Dennis Martínez
Sporting positions
Preceded by Dick Bosman	Baltimore Orioles Pitching Coach; 1995	Succeeded by Pat Dobson
Preceded by Ray Miller	Baltimore Orioles Pitching Coach; 1998	Succeeded by Bruce Kison
Preceded by Syd Thrift	Baltimore Orioles Vice President of Baseball Operations; December 4, 2002 – October 10, 2005	Succeeded by Jim Duquette
Preceded by Jim Beattie	Baltimore Orioles Executive Vice President of Baseball Operations; October 11, 2005–2007	Succeeded by position abolished (Andy MacPhail as President of Baseball Operations)
