= Chito Martínez =

Belizean baseball player (1965–2025)

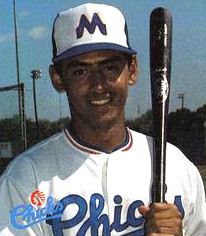
- Martínez in 1988
- Right fielder
- Born: December 19, 1965; Belize City, British Honduras
- Died: April 20, 2025 (aged 59); Lake Cormorant, Mississippi, U.S.
- Batted: Left Threw: Left

MLB debut
- July 5, 1991, for the Baltimore Orioles

Last MLB appearance
- April 20, 1993, for the Baltimore Orioles

MLB statistics
- Batting average: .259
- Home runs: 18
- Runs batted in: 58
- Stats at Baseball Reference

Teams
- Baltimore Orioles (1991–1993)

Reyenaldo Ignacio "Chito" Martínez (December 19, 1965 – April 20, 2025) was a Belizean Major League Baseball (MLB) player, the first in MLB history to be born in his country. He played for the Baltimore Orioles from 1991 to 1993.

== Playing career ==
Born in Belize City, Martínez emigrated to New Orleans with his family at two years old. The Kansas City Royals drafted him in the sixth round of the 1984 MLB draft, and he reached Triple-A in 1990. He set a Southern League record in 1989 by hitting home runs in five consecutive games but also led the league in strikeouts. He led the American Association in strikeouts in 1990 as well as slugging percentage. After toiling in the minors, he contemplated going into business with his father, whose company sold and serviced air conditioners.

Martínez signed with the Baltimore Orioles in November 1990. By July 1991, Martinez had the most home runs in the International League (20), and the Orioles called him up from the Triple-A Rochester Red Wings. He became the first Orioles player to record a hit in each of his first six MLB games. He hit the final home run in Baltimore Memorial Stadium on October 5, finishing finished his rookie season with 13 home runs and a slugging percentage of .514 in 228 plate appearances.

After his power dropped in 1992, with a .404 slugging percentage Martínez received less playing time for the Orioles. He led the team with pinch-hit at bats in 1992, but went only 4-for-22. He appeared in eight games for team in April 1993 but was demoted to the minors. In his second-to-last major league game, he ran into an inning-ending double play in which three baserunners all simultaneously touched third base. He did not return to the majors and played his final season in the minors in 1995.

== Personal life and death ==
Martínez's son, Drew, played college baseball for the Memphis Tigers, was selected by the Los Angeles Angels in the 10th round of the 2011 MLB draft, and played in the minor leagues from 2011 to 2016. Drew was the fundamentals coach for the Eugene Emeralds, the San Francisco Giants High-A affiliate, in 2025.

Another son, Dalton, played college baseball at Southern Polytechnic State University, reaching the NAIA World Series in 2018. He was the hitting coach for the Georgia State Panthers in 2020 and 2021 and is the head coach at Alexander High School in Douglasville, Georgia.

Martínez was nicknamed "Chito" by his grandmother when he was young. He is the only MLB player to have been born in what is now Belize.

Martínez died from a heart attack in Lake Cormorant, Mississippi on April 20, 2025, at the age of 59. His is buried at Autumn Woods Memorial Park in Olive Branch, Mississippi.
