= Bob Milacki =

American baseball player (born 1964)

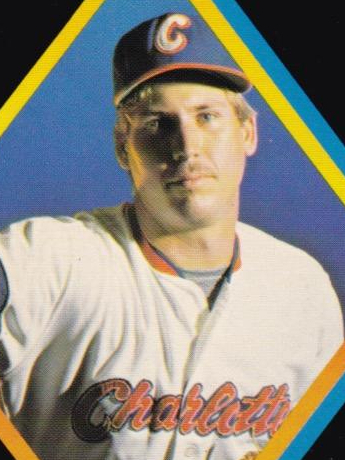
- Milacki with the Charlotte O's c. 1987

Idaho Falls Chukars
- Pitcher
- Born: July 28, 1964 (age 62); Trenton, New Jersey, U.S.
- Batted: Right Threw: Right

Professional debut
- MLB: September 18, 1988, for the Baltimore Orioles
- NPB: June 12, 1997, for the Kintetsu Buffaloes

Last appearance
- MLB: September 21, 1996, for the Seattle Mariners
- NPB: July 13, 1997, for the Kintetsu Buffaloes

MLB statistics
- Win–loss record: 39–47
- Earned run average: 4.38
- Strikeouts: 387

NPB statistics
- Win–loss record: 0–2
- Earned run average: 7.30
- Strikeouts: 9
- Stats at Baseball Reference

Teams
- Baltimore Orioles (1988–1992); Cleveland Indians (1993); Kansas City Royals (1994); Seattle Mariners (1996); Kintetsu Buffaloes (1997)

Career highlights and awards
- Pitched a combined no-hitter on July 13, 1991

Robert Milacki (born July 28, 1964) is an American former professional baseball player who pitched in Major League Baseball from 1988 to 1996, primarily with the Baltimore Orioles. He also played for the Kintetsu Buffaloes in Nippon Professional Baseball in 1997.

== Playing career ==
Milacki played college baseball for Yavapai Community College, where future teammate Curt Schilling later pitched. The San Diego Padres drafted Milacki in the first round of the January phase of the 1983 Major League Baseball (MLB) draft, but he did not sign. The Baltimore Orioles drafted him in the second round of the June 1983 draft. Milacki made his MLB debut with the Orioles in 1988, starting three games as a September call-up. He conceded only 2 runs and 9 hits in 25 innings. In his rookie season of 1989, Milacki led the American League with 36 games started, posting a 14–12 record with a career-best 3.74 ERA. He set a franchise record by pitching 243 innings as a rookie. Perhaps due to that workload, he was limited by shoulder tendonitis the following year.

On April 23, 1989, Milacki pitched a rare complete game shutout against the Minnesota Twins in which he faced the minimum 27 batters; he allowed 3 hits and 2 walks.

On July 13, 1991, the Orioles defeated the Oakland A's 2–0 on a combined no-hitter. Milacki pitched the first six innings of the game, with no runs on no hits, three walks and three strikeouts. He was pulled from the game after a line drive struck him on the arm, despite the batter being retired when the ball bounced towards first base. Mike Flanagan, Mark Williamson, and Gregg Olson each followed up with a no-hit scoreless inning to complete the no-hitter.

After posting a 6–8 record for the Orioles in 1992, Milacki became a free agent. He pitched a combined 22 major league games with the Cleveland Indians, Kansas City Royals, and Seattle Mariners through the 1996 season. He spent most of those seasons in Triple-A, serving as a spot starter and September call-up. He was elected to play in the 1995 Triple-A All-Star Game. In 1997, he pitched in six games for the Kintetsu Buffaloes in Japan's Nippon Professional Baseball with a 7.30 ERA. He returned to the American minor leagues, pitching in Triple-A in 1998 and 1999, then for the independent St. Paul Saints in 2000.

== Coaching career ==
Since 2001, Milacki has been a minor league pitching coach in several organizations:

- 2001: Hickory Crawdads, Low-A affiliate of the Texas Rangers
- 2002: Altoona Curve, Double-A affiliate of the Pittsburgh Pirates
- 2003–2004: Hickory Crawdads, Low-A affiliate of the Rangers
- 2005–2008: Lynchburg Hillcats, High-A affiliate of the Pirates
- 2009: Lakewood BlueClaws, Low-A affiliate of the Philadelphia Phillies
- 2010–2012: Reading Phillies, Double-A affiliate of the Philadelphia Phillies
- 2013–2014: Clearwater Threshers, High-A affiliate of the Phillies
- 2015–2017: Syracuse Chiefs, Triple-A affiliate of the Washington Nationals
- 2018: Carolina Mudcats, High-A affiliate of the Milwaukee Brewers
- 2019: Biloxi Shuckers, Double-A affiliate of the Brewers
- 2021–2025: Idaho Falls Chukars of the independent Pioneer League

== Personal life ==
Milacki was born in Trenton, New Jersey. After his parents divorced, he grew up in Lake Havasu City, Arizona. He graduated from Lake Havasu High School in 1982 and attended Yavapai Community College. Milacki and his wife have three children. Their daughter Ashlee played college basketball for Glendale Community College. Their son Bobby was drafted in the 38th round (1,151st pick) by the Washington Nationals in the 2018 MLB draft and pitched in Triple-A in 2024 and 2025.

| Preceded by Tommy Greene | No-hit game July 13, 1991 with Flanagan, Williamson & Olson | Succeeded by Dennis Martínez |
