= Mark Williamson (baseball) =

American baseball player (born 1959)

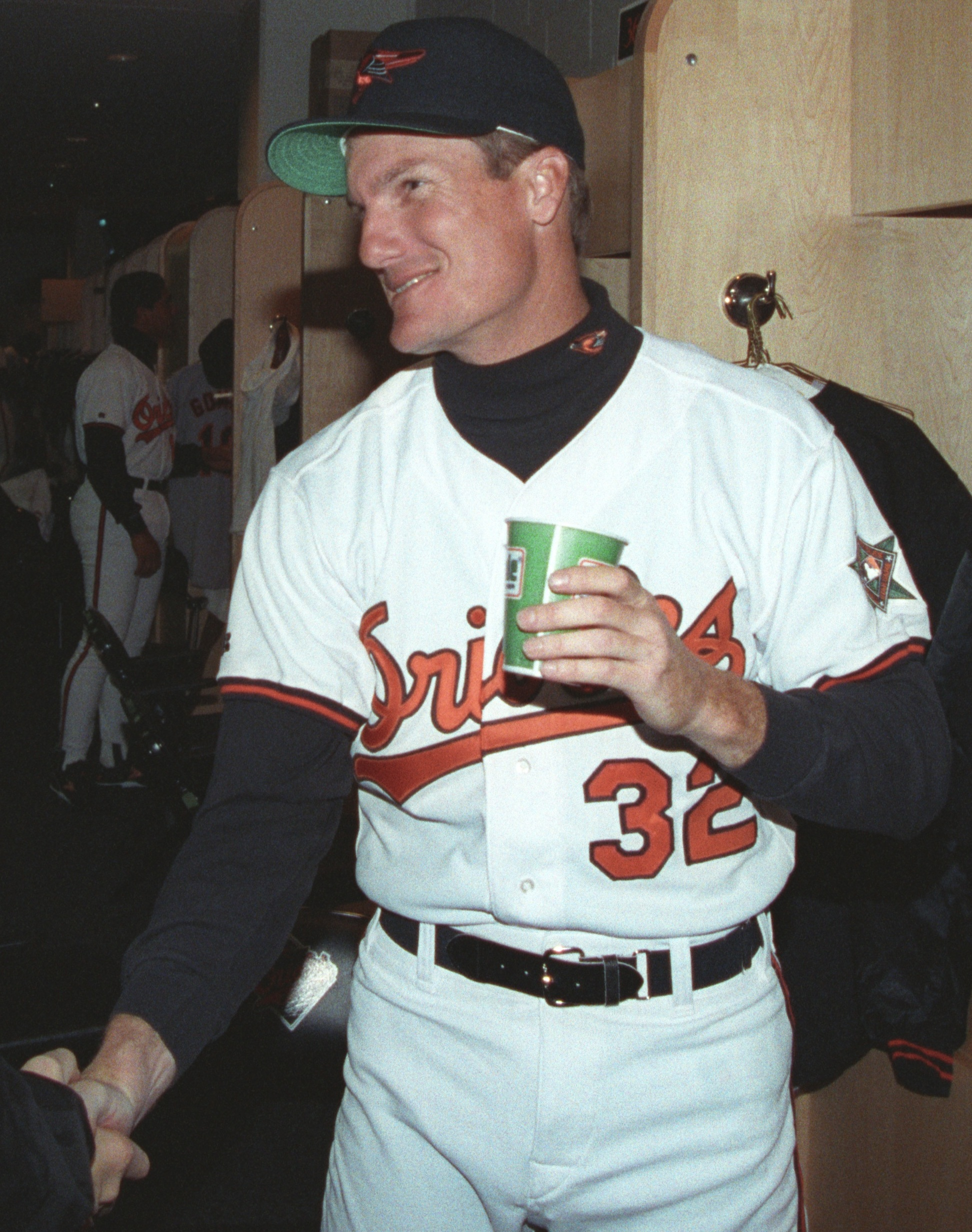
- Williamson with the Baltimore Orioles in 1993
- Pitcher
- Born: July 21, 1959 (age 67); Corpus Christi, Texas, U.S.
- Batted: Switch Threw: Right

MLB debut
- April 8, 1987, for the Baltimore Orioles

Last MLB appearance
- August 4, 1994, for the Baltimore Orioles

MLB statistics
- Win–loss record: 46–35
- Earned run average: 3.86
- Strikeouts: 397
- Stats at Baseball Reference

Teams
- Baltimore Orioles (1987–1994)

Career highlights and awards
- Pitched a combined no-hitter on July 13, 1991

Mark Alan Williamson (born July 21, 1959) is an American former professional baseball player who pitched in the Major Leagues from 1987 to 1994. He played for the Baltimore Orioles. On April 29, 1988, Williamson pitched 6 shutout innings to help the Orioles defeat the White Sox 9-0. The victory snapped the Orioles' 21-game losing streak that started the 1988 season. On July 13, 1991, he pitched a no-hitter along with Bob Milacki, Mike Flanagan, and Gregg Olson against the Oakland Athletics.

| Preceded by Tommy Greene | No-hit game July 13, 1991 with Milacki, Flanagan & Olson | Succeeded by Dennis Martínez |
