= Kevin McGehee =

American baseball player (born 1969)

- Pitcher
- Born: January 18, 1969 (age 56); Alexandria, Louisiana
- Batted: Right Threw: Right

MLB debut
- August 23, 1993, for the Baltimore Orioles

Last MLB appearance
- September 30, 1993, for the Baltimore Orioles

MLB statistics
- Win–loss record: 0–0
- Earned run average: 5.94
- Strikeouts: 7
- Stats at Baseball Reference

Teams
- Baltimore Orioles (1993)

George Kevin McGehee (born January 18, 1969) is a former Major League Baseball pitcher. McGehee played for the Baltimore Orioles in 1993.
