= University of Massachusetts Amherst College of Education =

School at the University of Massachusetts

Coordinates: 42°23′53.1″N 72°31′36.6″W

College of Education
- Public constituent college
- University of Massachusetts Amherst
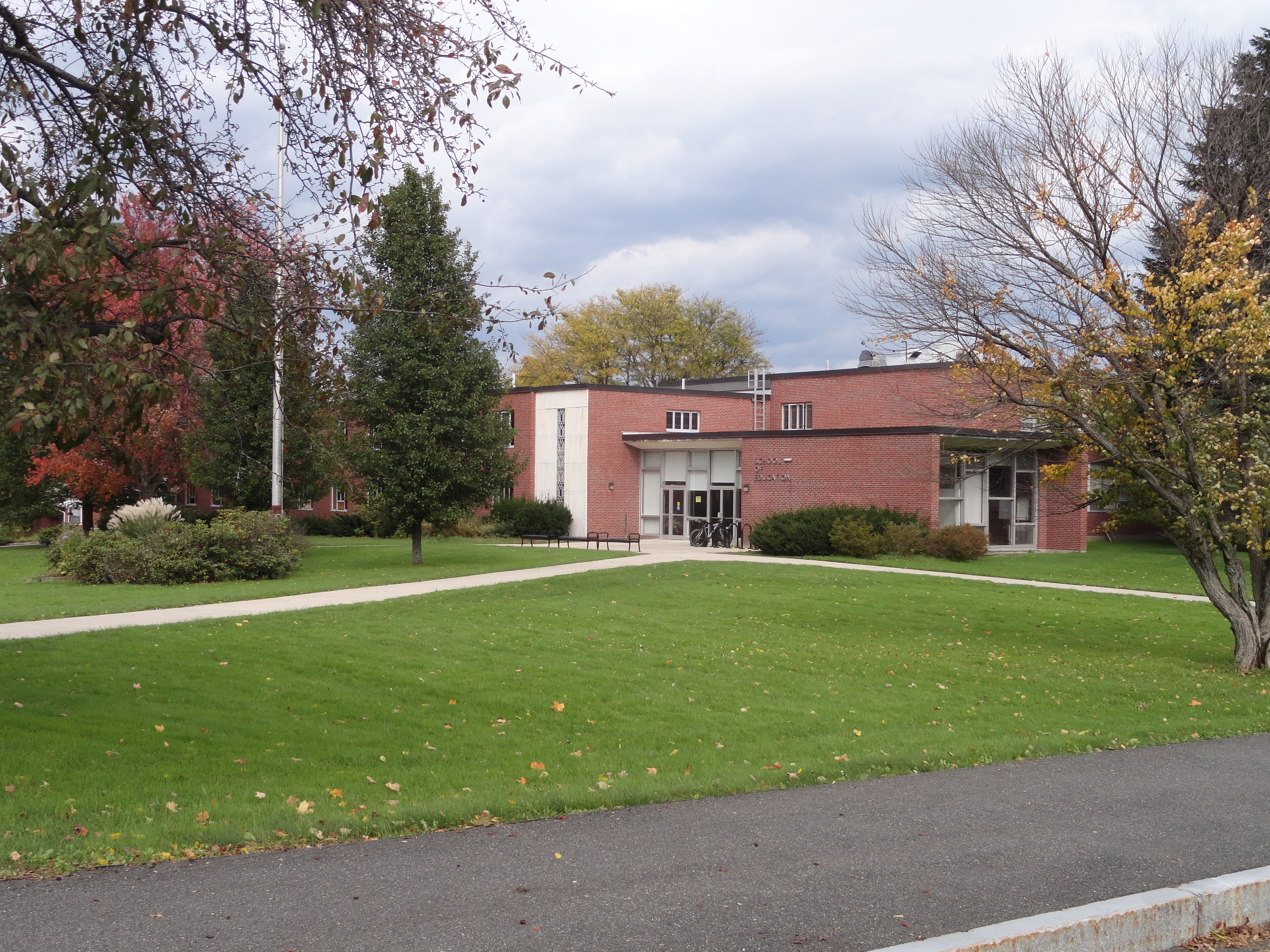
- Furcolo building

- Logo
- Location: 813 N Pleasant St Amherst, Massachusetts
- Full name: University of Massachusetts Amherst College of Education
- Established: 1906; 120 years ago
- Former names: Department of Agricultural Education (1908-1932); Department of Education (1932-1955); School of Education (1955-1962)
- Colors
- Gender: Co-educational
- Dean: Cynthia Gerstl-Pepin
- Newspaper: Equity and Excellence in Education (Journal)
- Website: http://www.umass.edu/education/

The University of Massachusetts Amherst College of Education is a college at the University of Massachusetts Amherst. Began in 1906 as the Department of Agricultural Education, changing its name to the Department of Education in 1932, and was organized as the School of Education starting in 1955. The school was first accredited in 1962. The college offers both undergraduate and graduate programs.

The college houses the journal Equity and Excellence in Education that addresses social justice issues in education.
