= Gregg Olson =

American baseball player (born 1966)

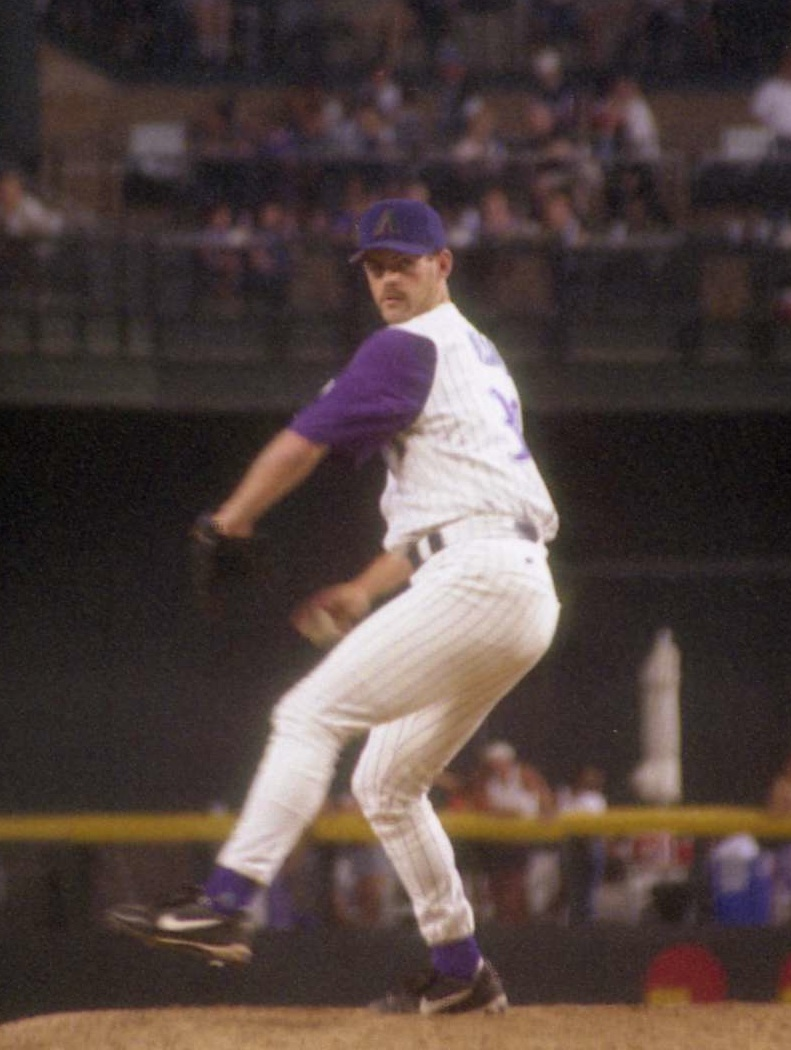
- Olson with the Arizona Diamondbacks in 1999
- Pitcher
- Born: October 11, 1966 (age 59); Scribner, Nebraska, U.S.
- Batted: Right Threw: Right

MLB debut
- September 2, 1988, for the Baltimore Orioles

Last MLB appearance
- June 22, 2001, for the Los Angeles Dodgers

MLB statistics
- Win–loss record: 40–39
- Earned run average: 3.46
- Strikeouts: 588
- Saves: 217
- Stats at Baseball Reference

Teams
- Baltimore Orioles (1988–1993); Atlanta Braves (1994); Cleveland Indians (1995); Kansas City Royals (1995); Detroit Tigers (1996); Houston Astros (1996); Minnesota Twins (1997); Kansas City Royals (1997); Arizona Diamondbacks (1998–1999); Los Angeles Dodgers (2000–2001)

Career highlights and awards
- All-Star (1990); AL Rookie of the Year (1989); Pitched a combined no-hitter on July 13, 1991; Baltimore Orioles Hall of Fame
Medals
Men's baseball
Representing United States
Pan American Games
| Silver medal – second place | 1987 Indianapolis | Team |
World Junior Baseball Championship
| Silver medal – second place | 1984 Saskatoon | Team |

Greggory William Olson (born October 11, 1966) is an American former professional baseball player, coach, scout and television sports commentator. He played in Major League Baseball (MLB) as a right-handed pitcher from 1988 through 2001, most prominently as a member of the Baltimore Orioles where he established himself as one of the premier relief pitchers in the American League (AL). Olson was named the AL Rookie of the Year in 1989, his first full season in the major leagues and, the following season was named to his only American League All-Star team. He set an Orioles team record of 41 consecutive scoreless innings and, he holds the team record for career saves.

During Olson's major league tenure, he also played for the Atlanta Braves, Cleveland Indians, Kansas City Royals, Detroit Tigers, Houston Astros, Minnesota Twins, Arizona Diamondbacks and Los Angeles Dodgers. In 2008, Olson was inducted into the Baltimore Orioles Hall of Fame and, in 2021 he was inducted into the National College Baseball Hall of Fame.

== High school and college ==
Olson attended Omaha Northwest High School in Omaha, Nebraska, where he was a pitcher. He was named to the ABCA High School All-America Baseball Team in 1985. He led the Huskies to four straight state titles. His father, Bill Olson, was his high school coach. Olson appeared in Sports Illustrated's "Faces In The Crowd" section for the 07-16-84 Vol 61, No. 3. In the state championship game of his senior year, Olson threw a no-hitter.

After graduating from high school in 1985, Olson attended Auburn University, where he played college baseball for the Auburn Tigers for three seasons. He was a decorated pitcher for the Tigers, earning First-Team All-America honors from Baseball America in both 1987 and 1988. Olson was a two-time SEC ERA leader, including a 1.27 mark in 1987, when he won back-to-back SEC Tournament games to lead the Tigers to their first NCAA Tournament since 1978.

== Professional career ==
The Baltimore Orioles selected Olson in the first round, with the fourth pick, of the 1988 MLB draft, and he signed for a $200,000 signing bonus before making his major league debut on September 2, 1988. A reliever, he threw what baseball historian Sheldon Stewart referred to as a "blazing fastball and devastating curve".

In 1989, Olson became the first reliever to win the American League Rookie of the Year Award. Olson also set an American League rookie record with 27 saves, and had a 5–2 mark with a 1.69 earned run average (ERA) and 90 strikeouts in 85 innings.

Selected to the All-Star team in 1990, Olson set a club record of 37 saves during the season and collected 31 and 36 in the next two years. On July 13, 1991, Olson combined with 3 other Baltimore pitchers in a no-hitter against the Oakland Athletics. In August 1993, Olson suffered a torn elbow ligament injury that sidelined him for the rest of the year. He finished with 29 saves and a career low 1.60 ERA, but Baltimore opted not to take a risk with him and signed Lee Smith as their new closer. Olson struggled with a succession of injuries over the next years, playing for seven different teams from 1994 to 1997.

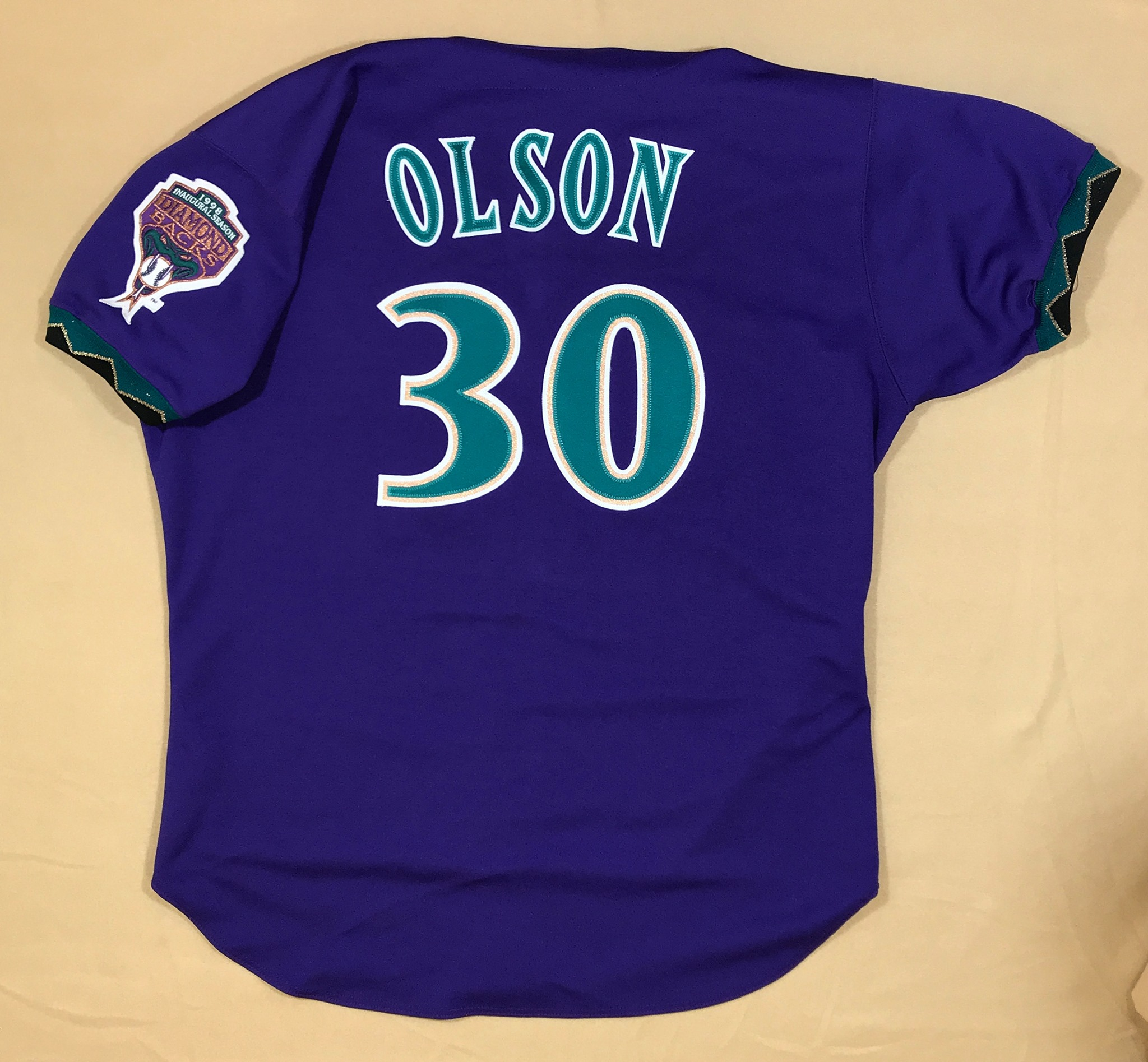
Arizona Diamondbacks 1998 #30 Gregg Olson alternate jersey

In 1998, Olson enjoyed a fruitful comeback with the expansion Arizona Diamondbacks. He set a franchise record of 30 saves (broken by Byung-hyun Kim in 2002) and was also part of a rare feat. On May 28, with Arizona leading the San Francisco Giants 8–5, Olson began the bottom of the ninth inning by striking out Darryl Hamilton, but the Giants then loaded the bases with two walks and a hit before Stan Javier had an RBI grounder that made it 8–6. After pinch-hitter J. T. Snow walked to load the bases, manager Buck Showalter ordered Olson to intentionally walk Barry Bonds, forcing home a run, and bringing up Brent Mayne, who worked the count full before he lined to right field for the third out. Olson put together one of the strangest saves imaginable, working around six walks in 1 1/3 innings. He threw 49 pitches (not counting the bases-loaded intentional walk) and only 22 of them were for strikes. Olson's only major-league hit was a home run during his last major-league at-bat, on April 20, 1998.

Olson was replaced by new closer Matt Mantei in 1999. He finished his career as a setup man for the Dodgers.

In a 14-year career, Olson compiled 217 saves with a 40–39 record, 588 strikeouts, and a 3.46 ERA in 672 innings pitched.

== Post-playing career ==
On March 19, 2008, Olson was elected to the Baltimore Orioles Hall of Fame, and was inducted during a pre-game ceremony at Oriole Park at Camden Yards on August 9, 2008. He is currently a scout for the San Diego Padres.

In 2016, Olson served as pitching coach to actress Kylie Bunbury, who played "Ginny Baker" on the scripted FOX television series Pitch.

From 2017 to 2020 Olson was a color analyst for Orioles broadcasts on MASN. He additionally covered a series for MASN in 2023 when the O's took on the Blue Jays May 19–21.

On March 29, 2021, Olson announced he had been diagnosed with prostate cancer.

== See also ==
- List of Major League Baseball players with a home run in their final major league at bat

| Preceded by Tommy Greene | No-hit game July 13, 1991 with Milacki, Flanagan & Williamson | Succeeded by Dennis Martínez |
