= Baltimore Orioles =

American professional baseball team

- 2026 Baltimore Orioles season

Logo	Cap insignia
- Established in 1894; Based in Baltimore since 1954

Major league affiliations
- American League (1901–present); East Division (1969–present)

Current uniform
- Retired numbers: 4; 5; 8; 20; 22; 33; 42

Colors
- Black, orange, white, gray

Name
- Baltimore Orioles (1954–present); St. Louis Browns (1902–1953); Milwaukee Brewers (1894–1901)

Nicknames
- "The O's"; "The Birds"

Ballpark
- Oriole Park at Camden Yards (1992–present); Baltimore Memorial Stadium (1954–1991); Sportsman's Park (1902–1953); Lloyd Street Grounds (1894–1901)

Major league titles
- World Series titles (3): 1966; 1970; 1983
- AL pennants (7): 1944; 1966; 1969; 1970; 1971; 1979; 1983
- AL East division titles (10): 1969; 1970; 1971; 1973; 1974; 1979; 1983; 1997; 2014; 2023
- Wild card berths (4): 1996; 2012; 2016; 2024

Front office
- Principal owners: David Rubenstein, Mike Arougheti, Mitch Goldstein, Michael Smith
- President: David Rubenstein (CEO)
- President of baseball operations: Mike Elias
- General manager: Jared Banner
- Manager: Craig Albernaz
- Website: mlb.com/orioles

The Baltimore Orioles are an American professional baseball team based in Baltimore. The Orioles compete in Major League Baseball (MLB) as a member club of the American League (AL) East Division. As one of the American League's eight charter teams in 1901, the franchise spent its first year as a major league club in Milwaukee as the Milwaukee Brewers before moving to St. Louis to become the St. Louis Browns in 1902. After 52 years in St. Louis, the franchise was purchased in 1953 by a syndicate of Baltimore business and civic interests, led by attorney and civic activist Clarence Miles and Mayor Thomas D'Alesandro Jr. The team's current owner is David Rubenstein. The Orioles' home ballpark is Oriole Park at Camden Yards, which opened in 1992 in downtown Baltimore. The oriole is the official state bird of Maryland; the name has been used by several baseball clubs in the city, including another AL charter member franchise which folded after the 1902 season and was replaced the next year by the New York Highlanders, later the Yankees. Nicknames for the team include the "O's" and the "Birds".

The franchise's first World Series appearance came in 1944 when the Browns lost to the St. Louis Cardinals. The Orioles went on to make six World Series appearances from 1966 to 1983, winning three in 1966, 1970, and 1983. This era of the club featured several future Hall of Famers who would later be inducted representing the Orioles, such as third baseman Brooks Robinson, outfielder Frank Robinson, starting pitcher Jim Palmer, first baseman Eddie Murray, shortstop Cal Ripken Jr., and manager Earl Weaver. The Orioles have won a total of ten division championships (1969, 1970, 1971, 1973, 1974, 1979, 1983, 1997, 2014, 2023), seven pennants (1944 while in St. Louis, 1966, 1969, 1970, 1971, 1979, 1983), and four wild card berths (1996, 2012, 2016, 2024).

Since their last World Series appearance in 1983, the Orioles have struggled to sustain success, including suffering 14 consecutive losing seasons between 1998 and 2011. In the 2010s, the team qualified for the postseason three times under manager Buck Showalter and general manager Dan Duquette, including a division title and advancement to the American League Championship Series for the first time in 17 years in 2014. However, the 2018 season saw the Orioles lose 115 games, the most in franchise history. Two years after finishing 52–110 in 2021, the Orioles went 101–61 in 2023, en route to winning the AL East for the first time since 2014. The Orioles' current manager is Craig Albernaz, while Mike Elias serves as general manager and executive vice president.

From 1901 through the end of 2026, the franchise's overall win–loss record is 9,274–10,253–110 (.475). Since moving to Baltimore in 1954, the Orioles have an overall win–loss record of 5,812–5,699–12 (.505) through the end of 2026.

== History ==
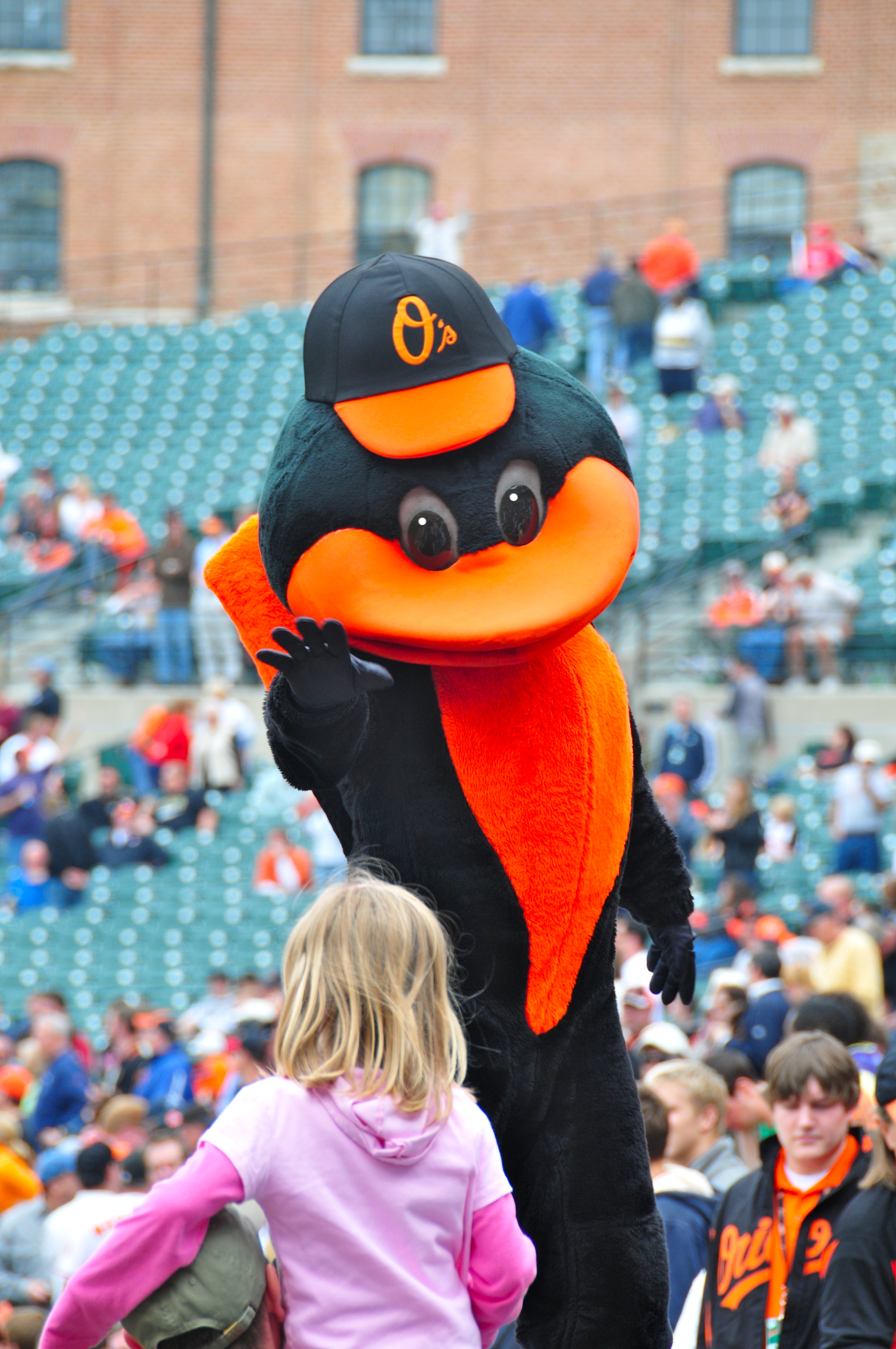
The "Oriole Bird", which has been the official mascot figure since April 6, 1979

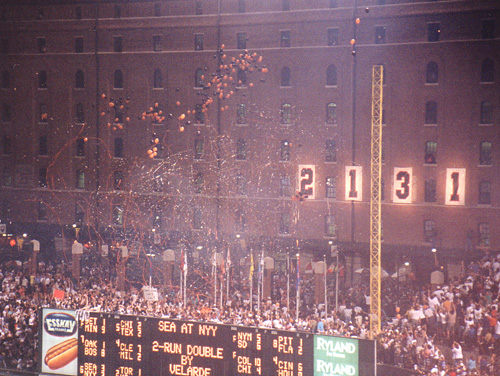
The numbers on the Orioles' warehouse changed from 2130 to 2131 to celebrate Cal Ripken Jr. passing Lou Gehrig's consecutive games played streak.

The Orioles franchise can trace its roots back to the original Milwaukee Brewers of the Western League (WL), beginning in 1894 when the league reorganized. The Brewers were still league members when the WL renamed itself the American League (AL) in 1900. At the end of the 1900 season, the AL removed itself from baseball's National Agreement, the formal understanding between the National League (NL) and the minor leagues, and declared itself a competing major league. During 1901, the first season the AL operated as a major league, the Brewers finished last among the league's eight teams.

In 1902, the team moved to St. Louis and became the "Browns", named after the original name of the 1880s club now known as the Cardinals. Although they usually fielded mediocre teams, they were very popular at the gate. In 1916, after years of prosperity at the gate, Robert Hedges sold the team to Phil Ball, who made a considerable effort to make the Browns competitive. However, Ball's tenure was marked by errors, including the firing of Branch Rickey, which eventually benefited the Cardinals, who shared Sportsman's Park with the Browns.

The 1944 season saw the Browns winning their only St. Louis-based American League pennant, becoming the last of the 16 teams that made up the major leagues from 1901 to 1960, to play in a World Series. In 1951, Bill Veeck purchased the Browns and introduced a series of promotions and wild antics. Veeck's efforts to drive the Cardinals out of St. Louis failed when Anheuser-Busch purchased the Cardinals. Veeck attempted to move the Browns to Milwaukee and then Baltimore, but both moves were initially blocked by other American League owners. Eventually, Veeck sold his stake to a group of Baltimore investors, and the team moved to Baltimore for the 1954 season, renaming themselves the Baltimore Orioles. The name has a rich history in Baltimore, having been used by Baltimore baseball teams since the late 19th century. The Orioles' early years in Baltimore were marked by a gradual climb to respectability, leading to their first World Series title in 1966. The Orioles enjoyed a period of sustained success from 1966 to 1983, winning three World Series titles and six American League pennants.

After the 1983 World Series win, the Orioles experienced a decline, culminating in the 1988 season where they lost the first 21 games. In 1989, the Orioles showed improvement with the "Why Not?" Orioles finishing second in the AL East. The opening of Oriole Park at Camden Yards in 1992 marked a new era, and the team returned to the playoffs in 1996 and 1997. However, the late 1990s and 2000s were characterized by losing seasons and rebuilding efforts. The Orioles saw a resurgence in the 2010s, making the playoffs in 2012, 2014, and 2016, with Buck Showalter as manager. The team struggled again towards the end of the decade, leading to a major rebuild. The 2020s have been marked by rebuilding efforts and developing young talent, aiming for future competitiveness.

=== Return to success and ownership changes (2022–present) ===
In 2022, anticipated first-round pick catcher Adley Rutschman made his major-league debut in addition to rookie closer Félix Bautista. The Orioles finished the 2022 season with an 83–79 record, becoming the second team in MLB history to have a winning season only one year after losing 110 or more games.

On June 9, 2022, Louis Angelos sued his brother, Orioles chairman and CEO John P. Angelos, and mother Georgia Angelos in Baltimore County Circuit Court. Louis Angelos claims that their father intended for the brothers and their mother to share control of the team. The lawsuit states the elder Angelos collapsed in 2017 due to heart problems and established a trust with his wife and sons as co-trustees. Louis Angelos is seeking to have his brother and mother removed as co-trustees of the trust that controls the Orioles and removed as co-agents of Peter Angelos' power of attorney.

The suit claims Georgia Angelos wants to sell the team and an advisor attempted to negotiate a sale in 2020 but John Angelos vetoed a potential deal. The suit claims Angelos unilaterally fired long-time employees loyal to his father, including former center fielder Brady Anderson, the longtime special assistant to the executive vice president for baseball operations. The suit claims John Angelos transferred tens of millions of dollars' worth of property out of his father's law firm and into a limited liability company controlled by his personal attorney. In separate statements released by the team, Georgia and John Angelos refuted the claims. In the event of any sale, Major League Baseball has reportedly encouraged Cal Ripken Jr to be part of any incoming ownership group that may take control of the team.

==== 2023 ====
In April 2023, the Orioles went 19–9, setting a franchise record for wins in the month of April. By August 2023, the Orioles, led by a core of first-and-second-year players Adley Rutschman, Gunnar Henderson, Félix Bautista and Kyle Bradish, were in first place in the division and described in The Athletic as "young, fun and arguably the best story in baseball." However, the front office went under scrutiny when it was reported that play-by-play announcer Kevin Brown had been suspended indefinitely by the Orioles for his pregame remarks on MASN, the team-owned network, two weeks earlier. During a "seemingly benign" introduction to a game against the Tampa Bay Rays, Brown observed that the team had not won a series at Tropicana Field in the past several seasons. It was described in The Athletic as a "petty" move by John Angelos, "the only person [in the organization] with enough power that no one dare question the validity of anything he says and does, no matter how foolish it is." Several broadcasters came to Brown's defense after the news broke. Gary Cohen said the team had "draped itself in utter humiliation" and Michael Kay said the suspension made "the Orioles look so small and insignificant and minor league." Brown returned to broadcasting for the team and stated in a public message that "recent media reports [had] mischaracterized my relationship with my adopted hometown Orioles" and that his relationship with the team was "wonderful".

In May 2023, following the team's new water-themed celebrations, Camden Yards created a Bird Bath splash zone in left field, where fans in one section had the opportunity get sprayed by the water hose-wielding "Mr. Splash" following an Orioles extra base hit.

The Orioles finished the 2023 season with a record of 101–61, winning the American League East division for the first time since 2014, and claiming their first 100+ win season since 1980. On July 30, the pitching staff of Dean Kremer, Mike Baumann, Shintaro Fujinami, Danny Coulombe, and Yennier Canó combined to set a franchise record for the most strikeouts in a 9-inning game against the Yankees. The 2023 pitching staff also broke the Orioles franchise record of single-season strikeouts on September 6. However, the team's successful season ended in the postseason American League Division Series, with the Orioles losing three straight games to the Texas Rangers. The series sweep was the first time since the 2022 season that the Orioles had been swept in a series.

Manager Brandon Hyde was awarded 2023 AL Manager of the Year, and players Adley Rutschman and Gunnar Henderson both were awarded the Silver Slugger Award. Additionally, Henderson was voted unanimous AL Rookie of the Year, marking the first time the team had a ROY winner since Gregg Olson in 1989.

==== 2024 ====
In January 2024, John Angelos reached a $1.7 billion deal to sell the Orioles to a group led by David Rubenstein, a Baltimore native and founder of The Carlyle Group. The group includes Cal Ripken, New York investment manager Michael Arougheti, former Baltimore mayor Kurt Schmoke, businessman Michael Bloomberg and NBA hall of famer Grant Hill. For tax reasons, the group would acquire 40% of the team with the Angelos family selling the remainder of Peter Angelos' stake after his death. The deal includes the Orioles' majority stake in MASN. Peter Angelos died aged 94 on March 23, 2024; his death occurred four days before the sale of the Orioles was finalized.

On August 1, 2024, the Orioles' majority ownership group led by private equity billionaire David Rubenstein took full control of the team, when a deal closed for the group to purchase the remainder of the organization.

== Regular season home attendance ==
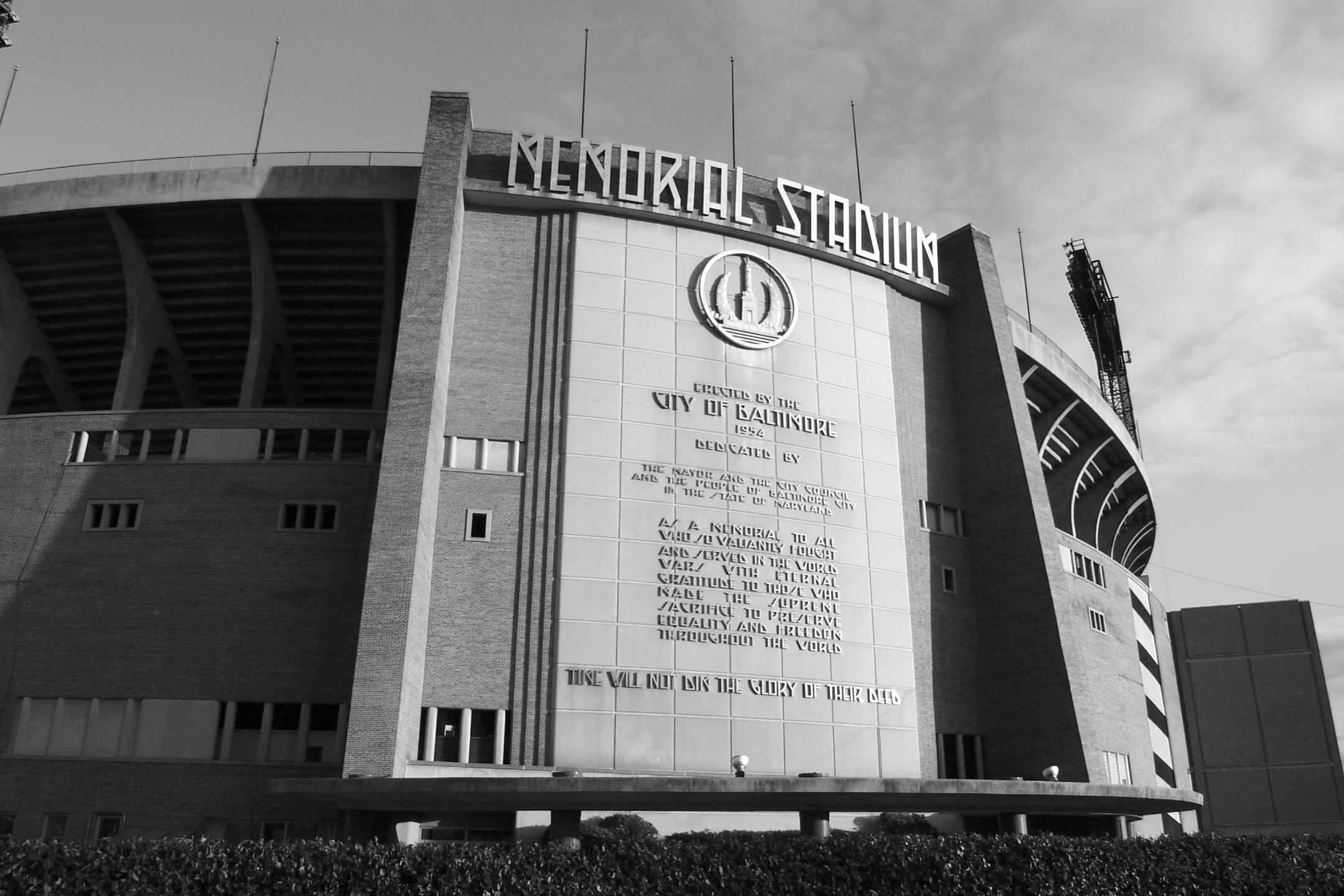
The facade of Memorial Stadium

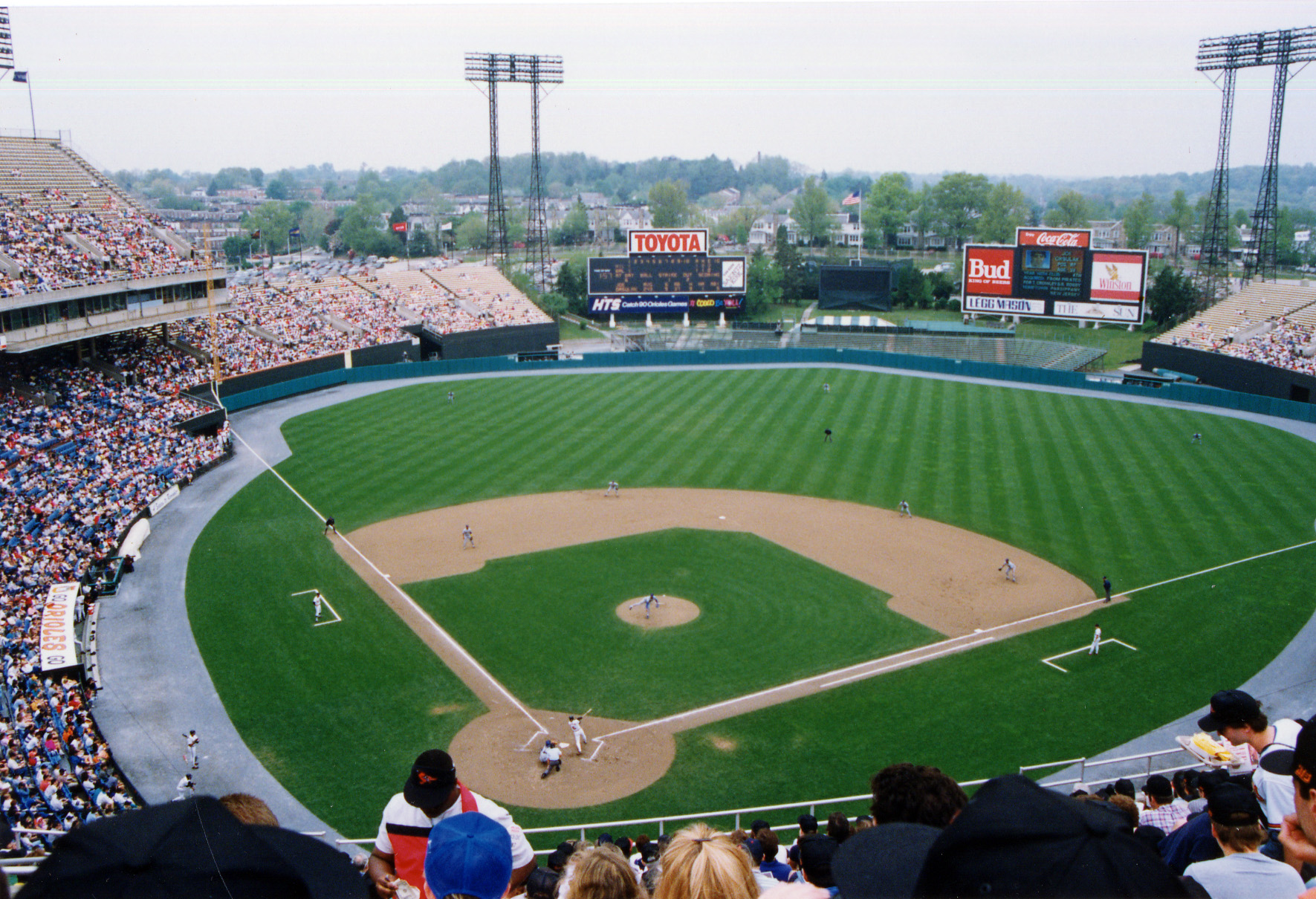
Baltimore's Memorial Stadium in 1991

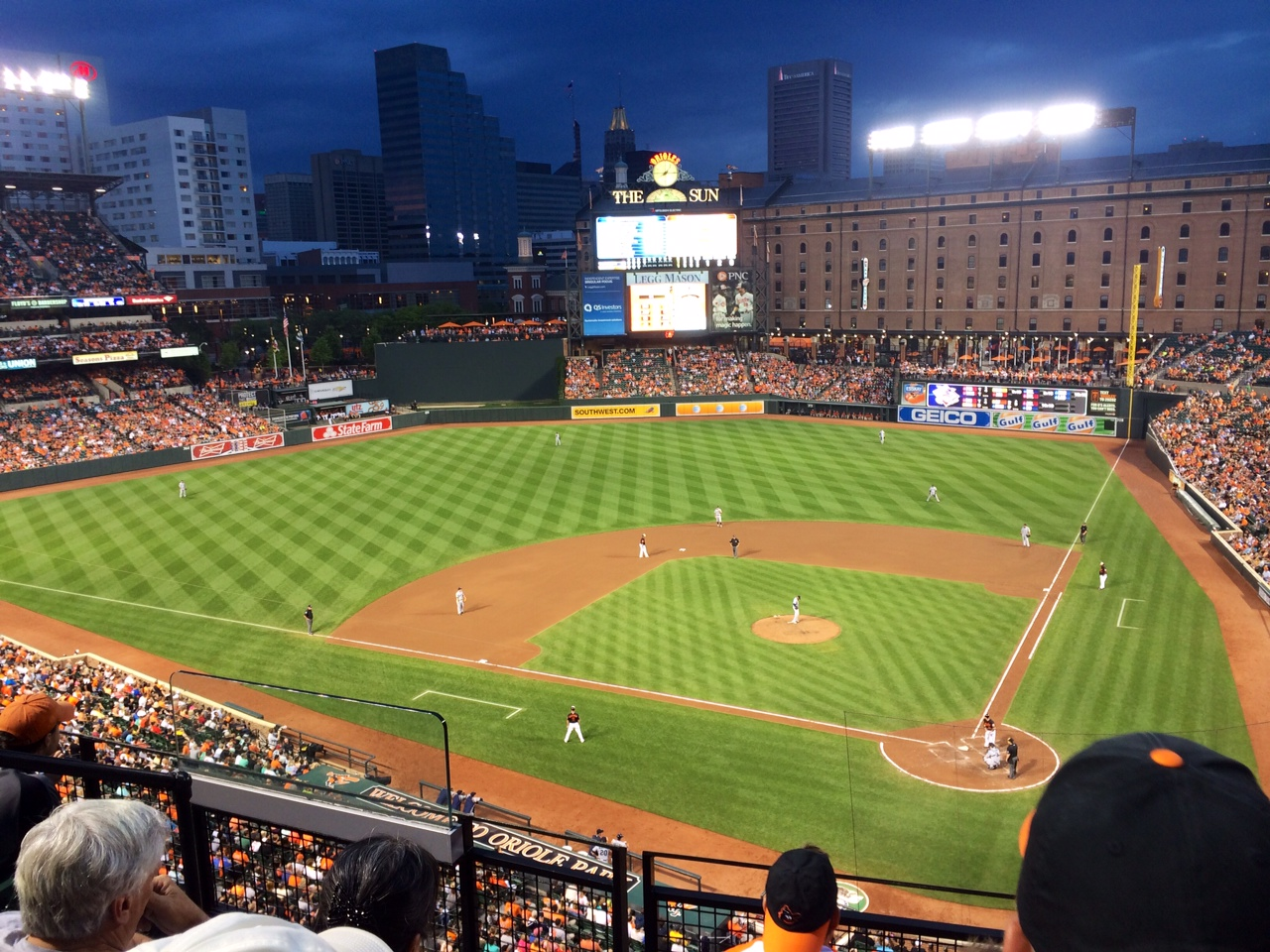
Camden Yards in 2014

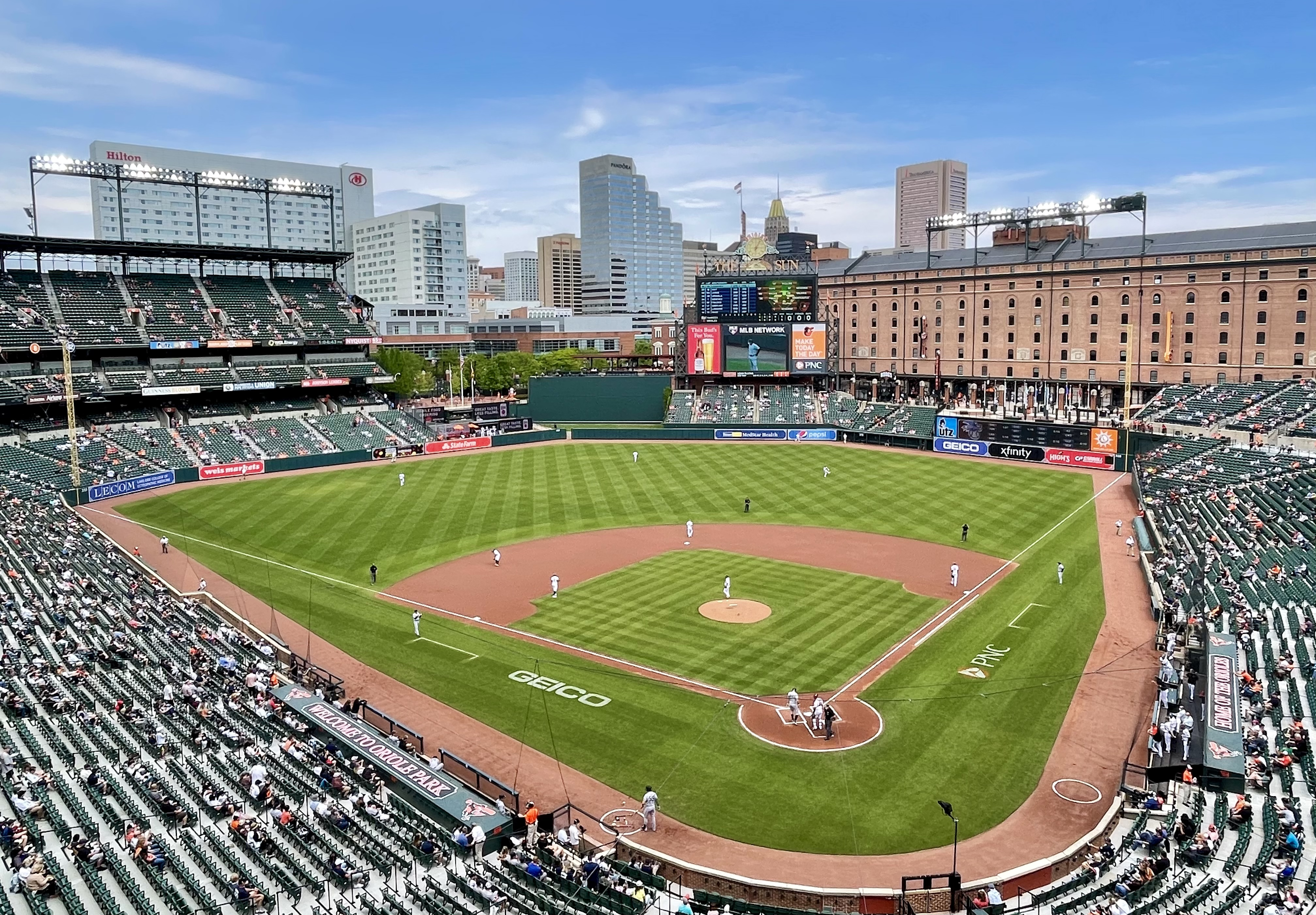
Camden Yards in 2021

=== Memorial Stadium ===
Home Attendance at Memorial Stadium
Year	Total attendance	Game average	AL rank
1954	1,060,910	13,778	5th
1955	852,039	10,785	7th
1956	901,201	11,704	6th
1957	1,029,581	13,371	5th
1958	829,991	10,641	5th
1959	891,926	11,435	7th
1960	1,187,849	15,427	3rd
1961	951,089	11,599	5th
1962	790,254	9,637	6th
1963	774,343	9,560	7th
1964	1,116,215	13,612	4th
1965	781,649	9,894	6th
1966	1,203,366	15,232	3rd
1967	955,053	12,403	6th
1968	943,977	11,800	6th
1969	1,062,069	13,112	5th
1970	1,057,069	13,050	6th
1971	1,023,037	13,286	3rd
1972	899,950	11,688	6th
1973	958,667	11,835	9th
1974	962,572	11,884	8th
1975	1,002,157	13,015	9th
1976	1,058,609	13,069	6th
1977	1,195,769	14,763	10th
1978	1,051,724	12,984	10th
1979	1,681,009	21,279	6th
1980	1,797,438	22,191	6th
1981	1,024,247	18,623	8th
1982	1,613,031	19,671	8th
1983	2,042,071	25,211	5th
1984	2,045,784	25,257	5th
1985	2,132,387	26,326	6th
1986	1,973,176	24,977	6th
1987	1,835,692	22,386	9th
1988	1,660,738	20,759	10th
1989	2,535,208	31,299	4th
1990	2,415,189	30,190	5th
1991	2,552,753	31,515	5th

=== Oriole Park at Camden Yards ===
Home Attendance at Oriole Park at Camden Yards
Year	Total attendance	Game average	AL rank
1992	3,567,819	44,047	2nd
1993	3,644,965	45,000	2nd
1994	2,535,359	46,097	2nd
1995	3,098,475	43,034	1st
1996	3,646,950	44,475	1st
1997	3,711,132	45,816	1st
1998	3,684,650	45,490	1st
1999	3,433,150	42,385	2nd
2000	3,297,031	40,704	2nd
2001	3,094,841	38,686	4th
2002	2,682,439	33,117	3rd
2003	2,454,523	30,303	5th
2004	2,744,018	33,877	5th
2005	2,624,740	32,404	5th
2006	2,153,139	26,582	10th
2007	2,164,822	26,726	11th
2008	1,950,075	24,376	10th
2009	1,907,163	23,545	9th
2010	1,733,019	21,395	10th
2011	1,755,461	21,672	11th
2012	2,102,240	25,954	7th
2013	2,357,561	29,106	8th
2014	2,464,473	30,426	6th
2015	2,281,202	29,246	8th
2016	2,172,344	26,819	10th
2017	2,028,424	25,042	12th
2018	1,564,192	19,311	14th
2019	1,307,807	16,146	14th
2020	—N/a	—N/a	—N/a
2021	793,229	9,793	13th
2022	1,368,367	16,893	11th
2023	1,936,798	23,911	9th
2024	2,281,129	28,162	8th
2025	1,803,655	22,267	10th
2026	1,829,252	22,583	11th

== Logos and uniforms ==
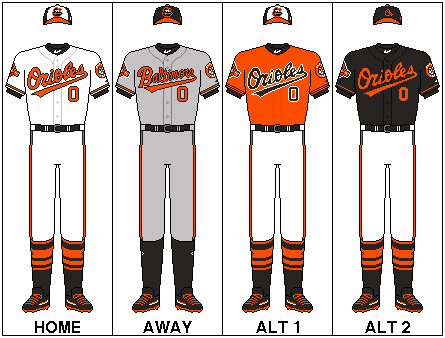
The 2012 uniforms. Left to right: home, away, Saturday (away with gray pants), Friday (away with gray pants).

The Orioles' home uniform is white with the word "Orioles" written across the chest. The road uniform is gray with the word "Baltimore" written across the chest. This style, with noticeable changes in the script, striping and materials, has been worn for much of the team's history, but with a few exceptions:

- In 1954, 1989–94 (road) and 1995–2003 (home), the scripted word "Orioles" and block letters are rendered in black with orange trim. The 1995–2003 style featured orange numbers in front but black letters in the back.
- From 1963 to 1965, the home uniforms featured "Orioles" in block lettering instead of the more familiar cursive script style. It was also rendered in black with orange trim.
- The underline below the word "Orioles" disappeared from 1966 to 1988.
- Road uniforms bore the team name from 1954 to 1955 and from 1973 to 2008.
- Extra white trim was added to the road and alternate uniforms from 1995 to 2000.
- Sleeveless home alternate uniforms were used in the 1968 and 1969 seasons.
- Player names were added to the uniforms in 1966, but the home uniforms originally featured black block letters. It would not match the road uniform lettering until 1971, which were orange with black trim.

A long campaign of several decades was waged by numerous fans and sportswriters to return the name of the city to the "away" jerseys which was used since the 1950s and had been formerly dropped during the 1970s era of Edward Bennett Williams when the ownership was continuing to market the team also to fans in the nation's capital region after the moving of the former Washington Senators in 1971. After several decades, approximately 20% of the team's attendance came from the metro Washington area.

In 2013, ESPN ran a "Battle of the Uniforms" contest between all 30 Major League clubs. Despite using a ranking system that had the Orioles as a #13 seed, the Birds beat the #1 seed Cardinals in the championship round.

=== Caps ===
The Orioles' cap design have alternated between the team's iconic "cartoon bird" logo and the full-bodied bird logo. Initially, the caps had the full-bodied bird logo between 1954 and 1965, alternating between an all-black cap and an orange-brimmed black cap. They also wore a black cap with an orange block-letter "B" for part of the 1963 season. The "cartoon bird" was first used in 1966, and with minor tweaks, was prominently featured on the team's caps until 1988. Initially, the Orioles kept the orange-brimmed black cap with the "cartoon bird" but switched to a white-paneled black cap with orange brim in 1975. Also that same year, they wore orange-paneled black caps to pair with the orange alternates, but these lasted only two seasons.

In 1989, the full-bodied bird logo returned along with the all-black cap, with a few tweaks along the way. Initially the cap was used regardless of home or road games, but in 2002 the caps were worn only on the road until 2008. An orange-brimmed variety was also introduced in 1995. Initially exclusive to the team's black uniforms, this style became the home cap in 2002 and became the team's regular cap (home or away) from 2009 to 2011.

In 2012, the Orioles brought back a modernized version of the "cartoon bird" along with the white-paneled and orange-brimmed black cap for home games and the orange-brimmed black cap for road games.

The Orioles wear four alternate caps. The script "O's" cap, introduced in 2005, is a black cap with orange brim and is typically worn with the black alternate uniform. Introduced in 2026 is a similarly designed "B" cap, similar to the "O's" cap but with the script "B" from their road uniform. Starting in 2027, the Orioles brought back the all-black full-bodied bird cap they last used in 2008 as another alternate. For games with the "City Connect" uniform, the Orioles wear a dark green cap with cream panel and orange brim featuring a stylized orange "B" in front; the previous version featured a black cap with the white script "B" in front.

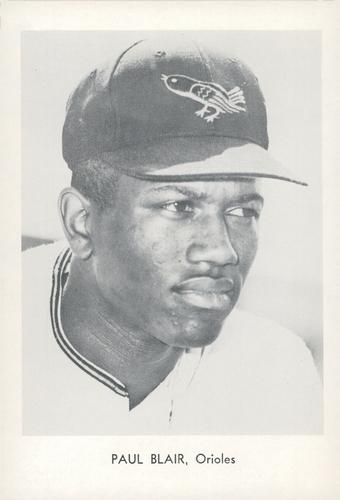
Paul Blair shown with the full-bodied bird logo between 1954 and 1965

=== Alternate uniforms ===
An alternate uniform is black with the word "Orioles" written across the chest. They first wore black uniforms in the 1993 season and continue to do so since; the current style with the letters lacking additional trim was first used in 2000. The Orioles wear their black alternate jerseys for Friday night games with the alternate "O's" cap (first introduced in 2005), whether at home or on the road; the regular batting helmet is still used with this uniform. In 2017, the Orioles began to use their batting practice caps for select games with the black uniforms. The aforementioned caps resemble their regular road caps save for the black bill. Occasionally, the Orioles would also wear the black alternates on other days of the week, often pairing them with the home or road "cartoon bird" caps. After the "City Connect" uniforms became the team's Friday home uniform (see below), the black alternates were only used on Friday road games and on home games depending on the preference of the starting pitcher.

The Orioles also wore orange alternate uniforms at various points in their history. The orange alternates were first used in the 1971 season and were paired with orange pants, but these lasted only two seasons. The second orange uniform, which was a pullover style, was worn from 1975 to 1987, but were not worn at all in the 1983, 1985 and 1986 seasons. A third orange uniform was used from 1988 to 1992, returning to the button-down style. In 2012, the Orioles brought back the orange uniforms as a second alternate uniform; the team currently wears them on Saturdays at home or on the road, though they've also worn them on other days of the week either due to pitcher's preference or a previously postponed contest. For 2025, the Orioles brought back the all-orange alternate for select games, while keeping the orange uniform/white pants option for a few other games.; the all-orange alternate is always worn with the road "cartoon bird" cap in a similar manner to its previous incarnation.

In 2023, the Orioles introduced a City Connect uniform, inspired by the art and culture of Baltimore and its neighborhoods. The uniform is mostly black base from the jersey to pants. Across the chest, it features the city name "BALTIMORE" in white lettering, and on the collar and sleeves features a small batch of colors and shapes, representing the neighborhoods of Baltimore. The cap, which is also on a black base, features an italic white "B". In 2024, the City Connect uniform was worn with the home white pants for select games.

Their second City Connect uniform, unveiled in 2026, is a cream base with dark green and orange sleeves, and paid homage to Oriole Park at Camden Yards. The chest featured the shortened nickname "BMORE" in dark green block letters with cream trim and orange drop shadows; atop the "R" is the Orioles' realistic bird crest prominently seen on their caps during the 1990s and 2000s. A sleeve patch inspired by the Eutaw Street home run plaques featured the full team along with the phrase "FROM THE STOOP TO THE YARDS" in an allusion to the city's beloved stoops on houses. The "410" sign below is the main area code of Maryland. Caps are in dark green with white panels and orange brim, and includes a stylized orange "B" as a nod to the original Baltimore Orioles.

=== Uniform advertisements ===
The Orioles announced its first-ever jersey sponsorship deal with T. Rowe Price on June 10, 2024. A circular dark blue, aqua and white sleeve patch with the investment management firm's bighorn sheep logo debuted in a home game against the Atlanta Braves the following night on June 11.

== Radio and television coverage ==
=== Radio ===
In Baltimore, Orioles radio broadcasts can be heard on WBAL-AM and WIYY, both owned by Hearst Television. Geoff Arnold, Melanie Newman, Brett Hollander, Scott Garceau and Kevin Brown alternate as play-by-play announcers. WBAL feeds the games to a network of 36 stations, covering Washington, D.C., and all or portions of Maryland, Pennsylvania, Delaware, Virginia, West Virginia, and North Carolina.

This is WBAL's fourth stint as the Orioles flagship. WBAL has carried Orioles games for most of the team's time in Baltimore. Prior to WBAL and WIYY, Orioles games were broadcast locally on WJZ-FM from 2015 to 2021. WJZ had earlier carried broadcasts from 2007 to 2010. WFBR carried Orioles games from 1979 through 1986, and WCBM carried Orioles games in 1987.

Six former Orioles franchise radio announcers have received the Hall of Fame's Ford C. Frick Award for excellence in broadcasting: Chuck Thompson (who was also the voice of the old NFL Baltimore Colts); Jon Miller (now with the San Francisco Giants); Ernie Harwell, Herb Carneal; Bob Murphy and Harry Caray (as a St. Louis Browns announcer in the 1940s).

Other former Baltimore announcers include Josh Lewin, Bill O'Donnell, Tom Marr, Scott Garceau (returned in 2020 season), Mel Proctor, Michael Reghi, former major league catcher Buck Martinez (now Toronto Blue Jays color commentator and former play-by-play announcer), Joe Angel and former Oriole players including Brooks Robinson, pitcher Mike Flanagan and outfielder John Lowenstein. In 1991, the Orioles experimented with longtime TV writer/producer Ken Levine as a play-by-play broadcaster. Levine was best noted for his work on TV shows such as Cheers and M*A*S*H, but lasted only one season in the Orioles broadcast booth.

=== Television ===
MASN, co-owned by the Orioles and the Washington Nationals, is the team's exclusive television broadcaster. MASN airs almost the entire slate of regular season games. Some exceptions include Friday Night Baseball on Apple TV, Saturday games on either Fox (via its Baltimore affiliate, WBFF) or Fox Sports 1, select weekday games on ESPN, or Sunday games on NBC (via its Balitmore affiliate, WBAL-TV) and Peacock. Many MASN telecasts in conflict with Nationals' game telecasts air on an alternate MASN2 feed.

Veteran sportscaster Gary Thorne served as lead television announcer from 2007 to 2019, with Jim Hunter as his backup along with Hall of Fame member and former Orioles pitcher Jim Palmer and former Oriole infielder Mike Bordick as color analysts, who almost always work separately. In 2020, Thorne and Palmer were removed from the television booth due to COVID-19 concerns and replaced with Scott Garceau. In 2021, MASN let go Thorne, Hunter, analysts Mike Bordick and Rick Dempsey, and studio host Tom Davis, and added Ben McDonald as a secondary analyst. Starting in 2022, Kevin Brown became the primary TV play-by-play announcer, with Garceau, Arnold or Newman the backups.

The Orioles severed their ties with Comcast SportsNet Mid-Atlantic (currently Monumental Sports Network under Ted Leonsis) at the end of the 2006 season in favor of MASN, a joint venture with the Washington Nationals. It had been the Orioles' cable partner since 1984, when it was known as Home Team Sports. The Orioles and the Washington Nationals have been in a dispute since the early 2010s, MASN is owned by both teams with the Orioles holding an 80% stake. The dispute which is ongoing as of October 2020 contends that the Nationals deserves a greater fee from MASN due to the team's recent success and market growth. When fees paid to each team were first negotiated, both teams were paid the same fees.

WJZ-TV was the Orioles' broadcast TV home, completing its latest stint from 1994 through 2017. Since MASN acquired rights in 2007, its coverage was simulcast on WJZ-TV under the branding "MASN on WJZ 13". MASN elected not to syndicate any Orioles or Washington Nationals games to broadcast television for the 2018 season, marking the first time since the Orioles' arrival that their games are not on local broadcast television.

Previously, WJZ-TV carried the team from their arrival in Baltimore in 1954 through 1978. In the first four seasons, WJZ-TV shared coverage with Baltimore's other two stations, WMAR-TV and WBAL-TV. The games moved to WMAR from 1979 through 1993 before returning to WJZ-TV. From 1994 to 2009, some Orioles games aired on WNUV.

== Musical traditions ==
=== "O!" ===
Since its introduction at games by the "Roar from 34", led by Wild Bill Hagy and others, in the late 1970s, it has been a tradition at Orioles games for fans to yell out the "Oh" in the line "Oh, say does that Star-Spangled Banner yet wave" in "The Star-Spangled Banner". "The Star-Spangled Banner" has special meaning to Baltimore historically, as it was written during the Battle of Baltimore in the War of 1812 by Francis Scott Key, a Baltimorean.

The tradition is often carried out at other sporting events, both professional and amateur, and even sometimes at non-sporting events where the anthem is played, throughout the Baltimore/Washington area and beyond. Fans in Norfolk, Virginia, chanted "O!" even before the Tides became an Orioles affiliate. The practice caught some attention in the spring of 2005, when fans performed the "O!" cry at Washington Nationals games at RFK Stadium. The "O!" chant is also common at sporting events for the various Maryland Terrapins teams at the University of Maryland, College Park. At Cal Ripken Jr.'s induction into the National Baseball Hall of Fame, the crowd, composed mostly of Orioles fans, carried out the "O!" tradition during Tony Gwynn's daughter's rendition of "The Star-Spangled Banner". Additionally, a faint but audible "O!" could be heard on the television broadcast of Barack Obama's pre-inaugural visit to Baltimore as the national anthem played before his entrance. A resounding "O!" bellowed from the nearly 30,000 Ravens fans who attended the November 21, 2010, away game at the Carolina Panthers' Bank of America Stadium in Charlotte, North Carolina. A similar loud "O!" was heard from fans attending Super Bowl XLVII between the Baltimore Ravens and the San Francisco 49ers. The "O!" chant was also heard during the 2016 Summer Olympics in Rio de Janeiro, Brazil, when Baltimore native Michael Phelps received his gold medal for the 4 × 200 m freestyle on August 9, 2016.

In recent years, when the Orioles host the Toronto Blue Jays, fans have begun to shout out the multiple instances of the word "O" in "O Canada". Washington Capitals fans will do the same when they play one of the NHL's Canadian teams.

=== "Thank God I'm a Country Boy" ===
Since August 1975, it has been an Orioles tradition to play John Denver's "Thank God I'm a Country Boy" during the seventh-inning stretch. The song was tremendously successful nationwide, topping the Billboard Top 100 for a week, and was played in stadiums across the country. The Orioles were chasing the Red Sox for the American League East Division title and incorporated numerous "good luck charms." After an inspiring comeback win, Oriole staff began playing this song at the seventh inning stretch of every home game as one of the good-luck charms. During a nationally televised game on September 20, 1997, Denver himself danced to the song atop the Orioles' dugout, one of his final public appearances before dying in a plane crash three weeks later.

Beginning in the 1999 season, Charlie Zill, then an usher, would put on overalls, a straw hat, and false teeth and dance around the club-level section (244) that he tended to. He went by the name Zillbilly and had an orange violin to spin for the fiddle solos. Zill performed the skit until shortly before he died in early 2013.

=== "Orioles Magic" and other songs ===
Songs from notable games in the team's history include "One Moment in Time" for Cal Ripken's record-breaking game in 1995, as well as the theme from Pearl Harbor, "There You'll Be" by Faith Hill, during his final game in 2001. The theme from Field of Dreams was played at the last game at Memorial Stadium in 1991, and the song "Magic to Do" from the stage musical Pippin was used that season to commemorate "Orioles Magic" on 33rd Street. During the Orioles' heyday in the 1970s, a club song, appropriately titled "Orioles Magic (Feel It Happen)", was composed by Walt Woodward, and played when the team ran out until Opening Day of 2008. Since then, the song (a favorite among all fans, who appreciated its references to Wild Bill Hagy and Earl Weaver) is played (along with a video featuring several Orioles stars performing the song) only after wins. In the 2010s, "Seven Nation Army" was often played as a hype song while the fans chant the signature bass riff as a rally cry during key moments of a game or after a walk-off hit. In the 2023 season, closer Felix Bautista would come out of the bullpen to the ominous whistle of The Wire character Omar Little.

=== The First Army Band ===
The United States Army Field Band from Fort Meade performs the national anthem before the Orioles' final home game of the season. The Band has also played the anthem at the finales of three World Series in which the Orioles played: 1970, 1971 and 1979. They are introduced as the "First Army Band" during the pregame ceremonies.

== PA announcer ==
For 23 years, Rex Barney was the PA announcer for the Orioles. His voice became a fixture of both Memorial Stadium and Camden Yards, and his expression "Give that fan a contract", uttered whenever a fan caught a foul ball, was one of his trademarks – the other being his distinct "Thank Yooooou ..." following every announcement. (He was also known on occasion to say "Give that fan an error" after a dropped foul ball.) Barney died on August 12, 1997, and in his honor that night's game at Camden Yards against the Oakland Athletics was held without a public–address announcer.

Barney was replaced as Camden Yards' PA Announcer by Dave McGowan, who held the position from 1998 to 2011, after Chris Ely finished out the 1997 season.

Lifelong Orioles fan and former MLB Fan Cave resident Ryan Wagner soon took over as the PA announcer. He was chosen out of a field of more than 670 applicants in the 2011–12 offseason. He held the job from 2012 to 2020. He was dismissed just hours before the team's 2021 home opener, reportedly because of his conduct on Twitter.

Adrienne Roberson, at the time the public address announcer for the Bowie Baysox and Wagner's primary substitute, has been the team's announcer from 2021 onward. She became the second woman to be named an MLB team's primary PA announcer, following Renel Brooks-Moon of the San Francisco Giants.

== Postseason appearances ==
Of the eight original American League teams, the Orioles were the last of the eight to win the World Series, doing so in 1966 with its four–game sweep of the heavily favored Los Angeles Dodgers. When the Orioles were the St. Louis Browns, they played in only one World Series, the 1944 matchup against their Sportsman's Park tenants, the Cardinals. The Orioles won the first-ever American League Championship Series in 1969, and in 2012 the Orioles beat the Texas Rangers in the inaugural American League Wild Card game, where for the first time two Wild Card teams faced each other during postseason play.

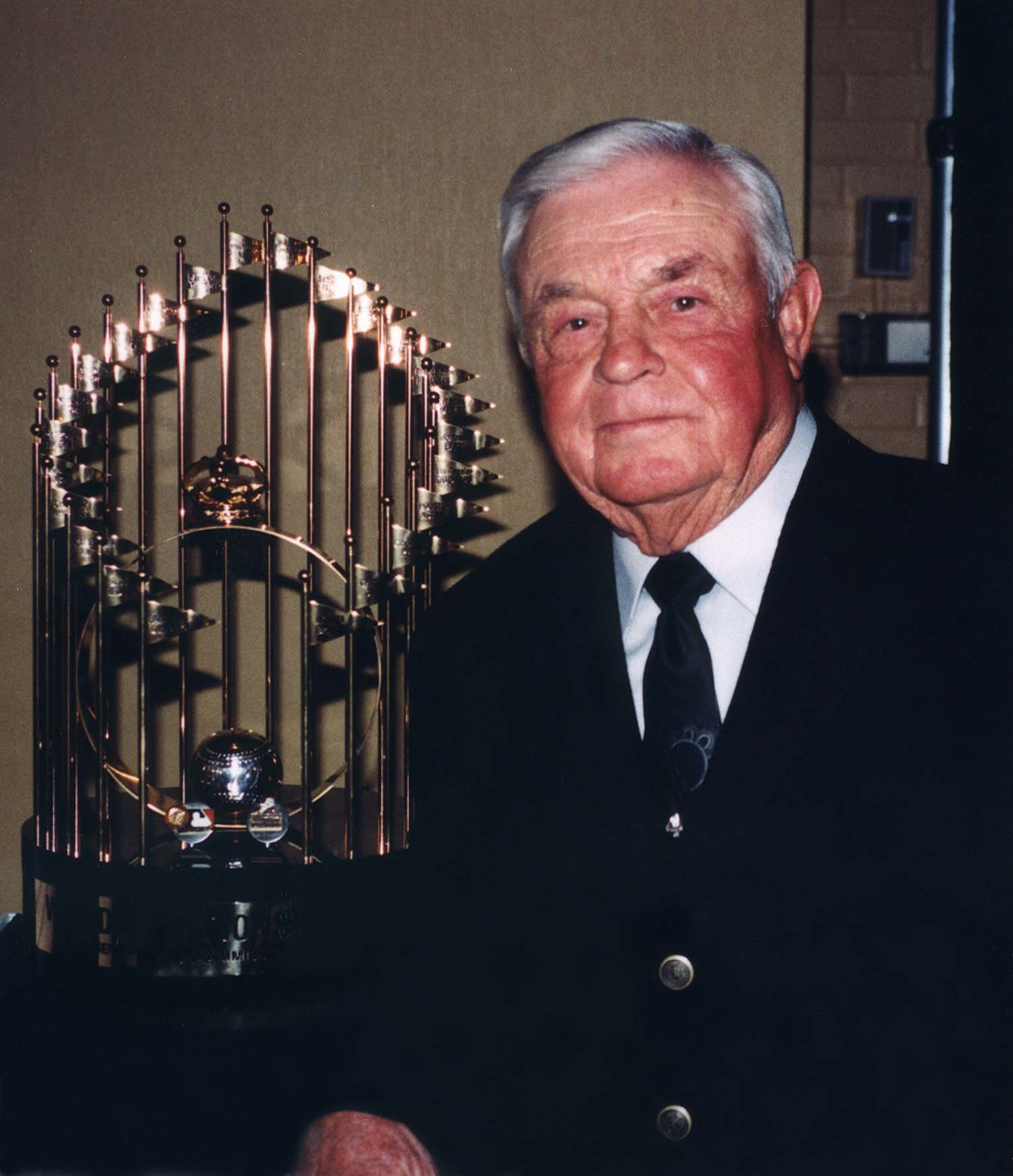
Earl Weaver with the 1970 World Series trophy

Year	Wild Card		ALDS		ALCS		World Series	
1944^{[A]}	Not played						St. Louis Cardinals	L
1966^{[B]}	Not played						Los Angeles Dodgers	W
1969	Not played				Minnesota Twins	W	New York Mets	L
1970	Not played				Minnesota Twins	W	Cincinnati Reds	W
1971	Not played				Oakland Athletics	W	Pittsburgh Pirates	L
1973	Not played				Oakland Athletics	L		
1974	Not played				Oakland Athletics	L		
1979	Not played				California Angels	W	Pittsburgh Pirates	L
1983	Not played				Chicago White Sox	W	Philadelphia Phillies	W
1996	Not played		Cleveland Indians	W	New York Yankees	L		
1997	Not played		Seattle Mariners	W	Cleveland Indians	L		
2012	Texas Rangers	W	New York Yankees	L				
2014	Bye		Detroit Tigers	W	Kansas City Royals	L		
2016	Toronto Blue Jays	L						
2023	Bye		Texas Rangers	L				
2024	Kansas City Royals	L						

1. ^{↑}Appeared as the St. Louis Browns
2. ^{↑}This and subsequent appearances as the Baltimore Orioles

== Baseball Hall of Famers ==
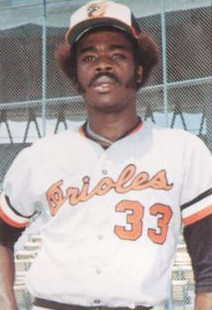
Eddie Murray

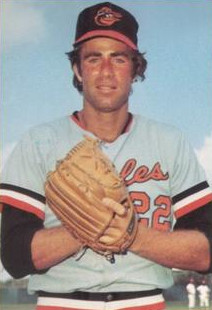
Jim Palmer

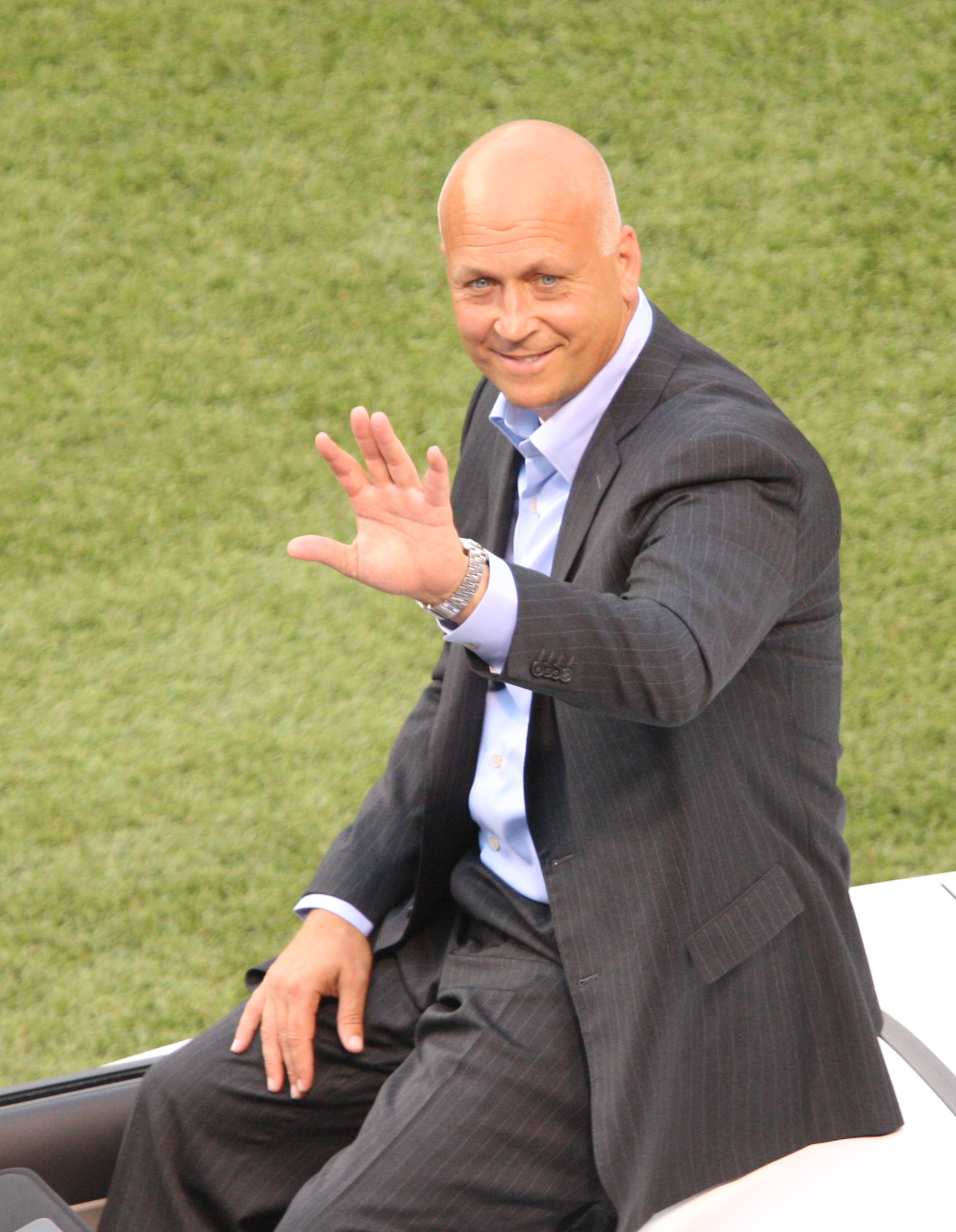
Cal Ripken Jr.

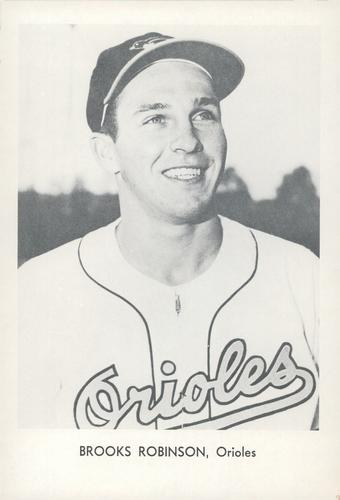
Brooks Robinson

Baltimore Orioles Hall of Famers
Affiliation according to the National Baseball Hall of Fame and Museum
Milwaukee Brewers

Hugh Duffy

St. Louis Browns

Jim Bottomley
Willard Brown
Jesse Burkett
Earle Combs^{†}

Dizzy Dean
Rick Ferrell
Goose Goslin
Rogers Hornsby

Heinie Manush
Satchel Paige
Eddie Plank
Branch Rickey

**George Sisler** *
Bill Veeck
Rube Waddell
**Bobby Wallace** *

Baltimore Orioles

Roberto Alomar
Luis Aparicio
Harold Baines
Pat Gillick^{††}

Vladimir Guerrero
Whitey Herzog
Reggie Jackson
George Kell

**Eddie Murray** *
Mike Mussina *
**Jim Palmer** *
Tim Raines
**Cal Ripken Jr.** *

Robin Roberts
**Brooks Robinson** *
**Frank Robinson**
Lee Smith

Jim Thome
**Earl Weaver** *
Hoyt Wilhelm
Dick Williams

- Players and managers listed in **bold** are depicted on their Hall of Fame plaques wearing a Orioles or Browns cap insignia.
- * St. Louis Browns or Baltimore Orioles listed as primary team according to the Hall of Fame
- ^{†} Earle Combs was a Browns coach in 1947.
- ^{††} Pat Gillick was elected as an Executive/Pioneer due in part to his contributions to baseball as general manager of the Orioles.

=== Ford C. Frick Award (broadcasters only) ===
Baltimore Orioles Ford C. Frick Award recipients
Affiliation according to the National Baseball Hall of Fame and Museum

Harry Caray

Herb Carneal
Bob Murphy

Milo Hamilton
J. Roy Stockton*

Ernie Harwell
**Chuck Thompson**

Jon Miller

- **Names in bold** received the award based primarily on their work as broadcasters for the Orioles or Browns.
- *Since J. Roy Stockton was also a newspaper reporter, and an awardee can only receive induction into the Hall of Fame under one award, his award came under the J.G. Taylor Spink award.

=== Retired numbers ===
The Orioles will retire a number only when a player has been inducted into the Hall of Fame with Cal Ripken Jr. being the only exception. (Note: Ripken's number was retired on October 6, 2001, in a ceremony moments before his last professional game.) However, the Orioles have placed moratoriums on other former Orioles' numbers following their deaths (see note below). To date, the Orioles have retired the following numbers:

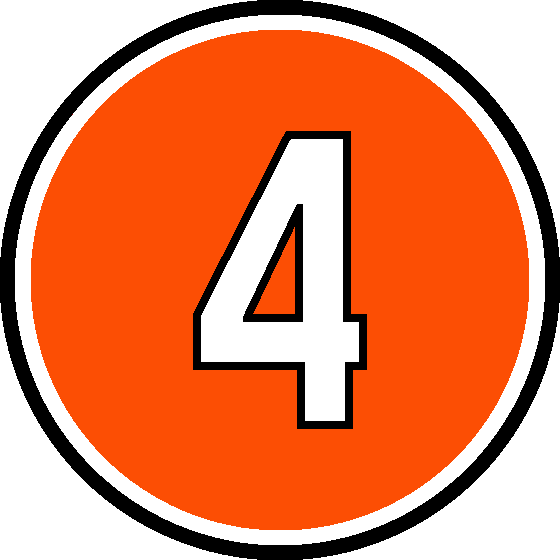
Earl
Weaver
Coach, Mgr

Retired September 19, 1982
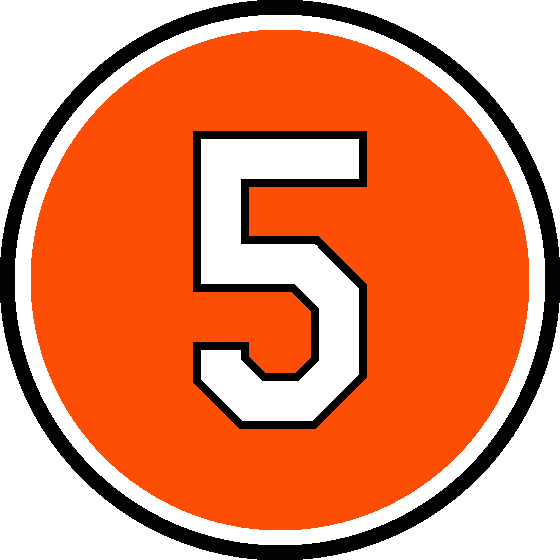
Brooks
Robinson
3B

Retired April 14, 1978
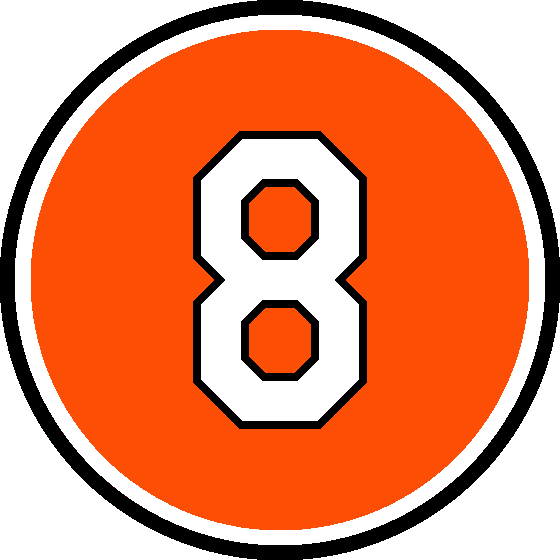
Cal
Ripken Jr.
SS, 3B

Retired October 6, 2001
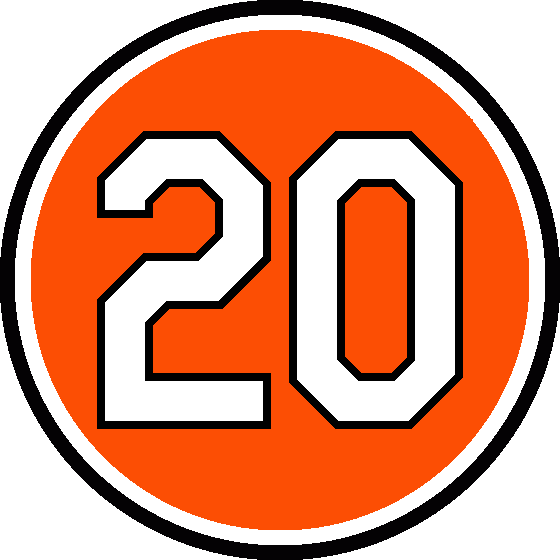
Frank
Robinson
RF
Coach, Mgr
Retired
1972
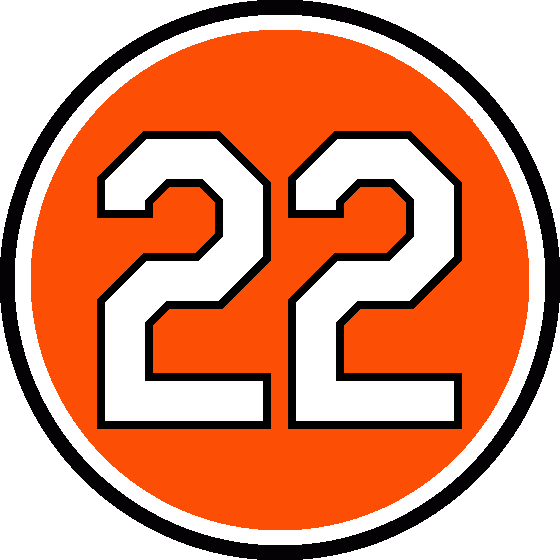
Jim
Palmer
P

Retired September 1, 1985
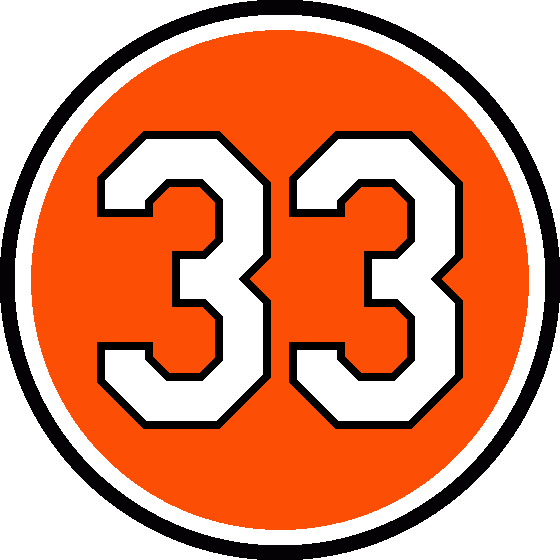
Eddie
Murray
1B, DH

Retired June 7, 1998
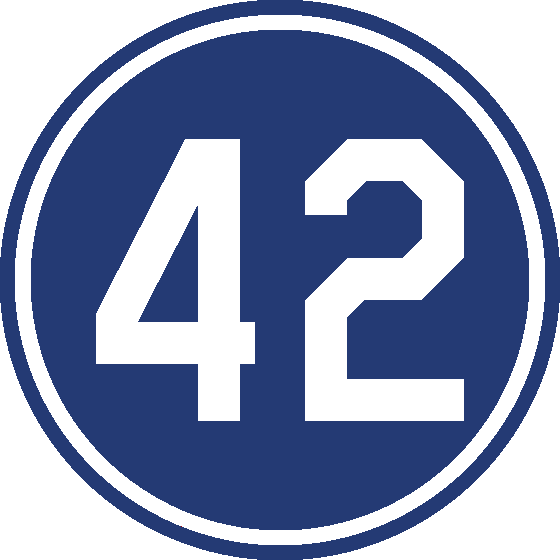
Jackie
Robinson^{†}
All MLB

Honored April 15, 1997

Note: Elrod Hendricks' number 44 has not officially been retired, but a moratorium has been placed on it and it has not been issued by the team since his death. Cal Ripken Sr.'s number 7 and Mike Flanagan's number 46 had similar moratoriums until 2024 when they were worn by Jackson Holliday and Craig Kimbrel respectively.

^{†}Jackie Robinson's number 42 is retired throughout Major League Baseball

=== Maryland State Athletic Hall of Fame ===
Orioles in the Maryland State Athletic Hall of Fame
No.	Name	Position	Tenure	Notes
9, 16	Brady Anderson	OF	1988–2001	Born in Silver Spring
3, 10	Harold Baines	DH/RF	1993–1995; 1997–1999; 2000	Elected on his performance with Chicago White Sox and the Orioles, born in Easton
13, 29, 59	Steve Barber	P	1960–1967	Born in Takoma Park
22, 48	Jack Fisher	P	1959–1962	Born in Frostburg
29	Ray Moore	P	1955–1957	Born in Meadows
36	Tom Phoebus	P	1966–1970	Attended Mount Saint Joseph College, born in Baltimore
3, 7	Billy Ripken	2B	1987–1992, 1996	Born in Havre de Grace, raised in Aberdeen
8	Cal Ripken Jr.	SS/3B	1981–2001	Born in Havre de Grace, raised in Aberdeen
5	Brooks Robinson	3B	1955–1977	

=== Baltimore Orioles Hall of Fame ===
The Orioles' official team hall of fame is located on display on Eutaw Street at Camden Yards.

=== Team captains ===
- 33 Eddie Murray, 1B/DH, 1986–1988

== Roster ==
Baltimore Orioles 2027 spring training roster
40-man roster		Non-roster invitees	Coaches / other
Pitchers: 74 Félix Bautista; 34 Shane Baz; 38 Kyle Bradish; -- Braxton Bragg; 78 Yennier Canó; 81 Luis De León; -- Michael Forret; 50 Rico Garcia; -- Nestor German; 43 Trey Gibson; 21 Ryan Helsley; 76 Yaramil Hiraldo; 26 Alex Hoppe; 66 Anthony Nunez; 37 Cade Povich; -- Patrick Reilly; 73 Cam Sanders; 61 Josh Walker; -- Levi Wells; 48 Grant Wolfram; 63 Brandon Young	Catchers: 29 Samuel Basallo; 75 Carlos Narváez; Infielders: 23 Blaze Alexander; 25 Pete Alonso; 32 Christian Encarnacion-Strand; -- Aron Estrada; 2 Gunnar Henderson; 7 Jackson Holliday; 82 Jeremiah Jackson; 16 Coby Mayo; 11 Jordan Westburg; Outfielders: 12 Dylan Beavers; -- Enrique Bradfield; 17 Colton Cowser; 27 Christian Franklin; 9 Tyler O'Neill; 62 Reed Trimble		Manager: 55 Craig Albernaz; Coaches: 36 Jason Bourgeois (first base); 46 Buck Britton (third base); 47 Miguel Cairo (infield); 51 Hank Conger (bullpen); 53 Donnie Ecker (bench); 58 Drew French (pitching); 89 Ryan Klimek (pitching strategy); 86 Dustin Lind (hitting); 85 Brady North (assistant hitting); 77 Mitch Plassmeyer (assistant pitching); 87 Joe Singley (field coordinator/catching); 38 active, 0 inactive, 0 non-roster invitees; 7-, 10-, or 15-day injured list; * Not on active roster; ^{†} Suspended list; Roster, coaches, and NRIs updated November 17, 2026; Transactions • Depth chart; → All MLB rosters

== Minor league affiliates ==
The Baltimore Orioles farm system consists of seven minor league affiliates.

Level	Team	League	Location
Triple-A	Norfolk Tides	International League	Norfolk, Virginia
Double-A	Chesapeake Baysox	Eastern League	Bowie, Maryland
High-A	Frederick Keys	South Atlantic League	Frederick, Maryland
Single-A	Delmarva Shorebirds	Carolina League	Salisbury, Maryland
Rookie	FCL Orioles	Florida Complex League	Sarasota, Florida
Rookie	DSL Orioles Black	Dominican Summer League	San Antonio de Guerra, Santo Domingo
Rookie	DSL Orioles Orange	Dominican Summer League	San Antonio de Guerra, Santo Domingo

== Franchise records and award winners ==
=== Individual records – batting ===
- Highest batting average: .340, Melvin Mora (2004)
- Most at bats: 673, B. J. Surhoff (1999)
- Most plate appearances: 749, Brady Anderson (1992)
- Most games: 163, Brooks Robinson (1961, 1964) and Cal Ripken (1996)
- Most runs: 132, Roberto Alomar (1996)
- Most hits: 214, Miguel Tejada (2006)
- Most total bases: 370, Chris Davis (2013)
- Highest slugging %: .646, Jim Gentile (1961)
- Highest on-base %: .442, Bob Nieman (1956)
- Most singles: 158, Al Bumbry (1980)
- Most doubles: 56, Brian Roberts (2009)
- Most triples: 12, Paul Blair (1967)
- Most home runs, RHB: 49, Frank Robinson (1966)
- Most home runs, LHB: 53, Chris Davis (2013)
- Most home runs, leadoff hitter: 35, Brady Anderson (1996)
- Most home runs, leading off game: 12, Brady Anderson (1996)
- Most consecutive games leading off with a home run: 4, Brady Anderson (April 18–21, 1996)
- Most extra base hits: 96, Chris Davis (2013)
- Most RBI, LHB: 142, Rafael Palmeiro (1996)
- Most RBI, RHB: 150, Miguel Tejada (2004)
- Most RBI, switch: 124, Eddie Murray (1985)
- Most RBI, month: 37, Albert Belle (June 2000)
- Most GWRBI: 25, Rafael Palmeiro (1998)
- Most consecutive games hit safely: 30, Eric Davis (1998)
- Most sac hits: 23, Mark Belanger (1975)
- Most sac flies: 17, Bobby Bonilla (1996)
- Most stolen bases: 57, Luis Aparicio (1964)
- Most walks: 118, Ken Singleton (1975)
- Most intentional walks: 25, Eddie Murray (1984)
- Most strikeouts: 219, Chris Davis (2016)
- Fewest strikeouts: 19, Rich Dauer (1980)
- Most hit by pitch: 24, Brady Anderson (1999)
- Most GIDP: 32, Cal Ripken (1985)
- Most pinch hits: 24, Dave Philley (1961)
- Most consecutive pinch hits: 6, Bob Johnson (1964)
- Most pinch-hit RBI: 18, Dave Philley (1961)

=== Individual records – pitching ===
- Most games: 81, Jamie Walker (2007)
- Most games, rookie: 67, Jorge Julio (2002)
- Most games, started: 40, Dave McNally (1969–70), Mike Cuellar (1970), Jim Palmer (1976), and Mike Flanagan (1978)
- Most games started, rookie: 36, Bob Milacki (1989)
- Most complete games: 25, Jim Palmer (1975)
- Most games finished: 63, Jim Johnson (2012–13)
- Most wins: 25, Steve Stone (1980)
- Most wins, rookie: 19, Wally Bunker (1964)
- Most losses: 21, Don Larsen (1954)
- Best won-lost %: .808, Dave McNally (1971)
- Most bases on balls: 181, Bob Turley (1954)
- Most hit batsmen: 18, Daniel Cabrera (2008)
- Most strikeouts: 221, Érik Bédard (2007)
- Most innings pitched: 323, Jim Palmer (1975)
- Most innings pitched, rookie: 243, Bob Milacki (1989)
- Most shutouts: 10, Jim Palmer (1975)
- Most consecutive shutout innings: 36, Hal Brown (July 7 – August 8, 1961)
- Most home runs allowed: 35, 4 times; last: Jeremy Guthrie (2009)
- Fewest home runs allowed (by qualifier): 8, Milt Pappas (209 IP) (1959) and Billy Loes (155 IP) (1957)
- Lowest ERA (by qualifier): 1.95, Dave McNally (1968)
- Highest ERA (by qualifier): 5.90, Rodrigo Lopez (2006)
- Most saves: 51, Jim Johnson (2012)
- Most saves, rookie: 27, Gregg Olson (1989)
- Most wins, reliever: 14, Stu Miller (1965)
- Most relief points: 131, Randy Myers (1997)
- Most innings pitched by reliever: 140.1, Sammy Stewart (1983)
- Most consecutive wins: 15, Dave McNally (April 12 – August 3, 1969)
- Most consecutive losses: 10, Jay Tibbs (July 10 – October 1, 1988)
- Most consecutive losses, start of season: 8, Mike Boddicker (1988) and Jason Johnson (2000)
- Most wins vs. one club: 6, Wally Bunker vs. Kansas City (1964)
- Most losses vs. one club: 5 Don Larsen vs. White Sox (1954), Joe Coleman vs. Yankees (1954), and Jim Wilson vs. Cleveland (1955)
- Most wins by opponent: 6, Andy Pettitte, Yankees (2003) and Bud Daley, Kansas City (1959)
- Most losses by opponent: 5, Ned Garver, Kansas City (1957), Dick Stigman, Minnesota (1963), Stan Williams, Cleveland (1969), and Catfish Hunter, Yankees (1976)

== Rivalries ==
=== Washington Nationals ===
The Orioles have a minor regional rivalry with the nearby Washington Nationals nicknamed the Beltway Series or Battle of the Beltways. Baltimore currently leads the series with a 55–39 record over the Nationals. They have divisional rivals within the American League East, predominately with the New York Yankees in the past and in more recent years with the Toronto Blue Jays.

== Bibliography ==
- Bready, James H. The Home Team. 4th ed. Baltimore: 1984.
- Eisenberg, John. From 33rd Street to Camden Yards. New York: Contemporary Books, 2001.
- Hawkins, John C. This Date in Baltimore Orioles & St. Louis Browns History. Briarcliff Manor, New York: Stein & Day, 1983.
- Miller, James Edward. The Baseball Business: Pursuing Pennants and Profits in Baltimore. Chapel Hill, North Carolina: University of North Carolina Press, 1990.
- Patterson, Ted. The Baltimore Orioles. Dallas: Taylor Publishing Co., 1994.

Awards and achievements
Preceded by Los Angeles Dodgers; 1965	World Series champions 1966	Succeeded by St. Louis Cardinals; 1967
Preceded by New York Mets; 1969	World Series champions 1970	Succeeded by Pittsburgh Pirates; 1971
Preceded by St. Louis Cardinals; 1982	World Series champions 1983	Succeeded by Detroit Tigers; 1984
Preceded by New York Yankees; 1943	American League champions St. Louis Browns; 1944	Succeeded by Detroit Tigers; 1945
Preceded by Minnesota Twins; 1965	American League champions Baltimore Orioles; 1966	Succeeded by Boston Red Sox; 1967
Preceded by Detroit Tigers; 1968	American League champions 1969–1971	Succeeded by Oakland Athletics; 1972–1974
Preceded by New York Yankees; 1976–1978	American League champions 1979	Succeeded by Kansas City Royals; 1980
Preceded by Milwaukee Brewers; 1982	American League champions 1983	Succeeded by Detroit Tigers; 1984
