= 1993 Toronto Blue Jays season =

Major League Baseball season

1993 Toronto Blue Jays
- World Series champions American League champions American League East champions
- League: American League
- Division: East
- Ballpark: SkyDome
- City: Toronto
- Record: 95–67 (.586)
- Divisional place: 1st
- Owners: Labatt Breweries, Canadian Imperial Bank of Commerce, Paul Beeston (CEO)
- General managers: Pat Gillick
- Managers: Cito Gaston
- Television: CFTO-TV 9/CBLT–TV 5 (Don Chevrier, Tom Hutton, Brian Williams, Fergie Olver, Jim Hughson); The Sports Network (Jim Hughson, Buck Martinez)
- Radio: CJCL–AM 1430 (Tom Cheek, Jerry Howarth)

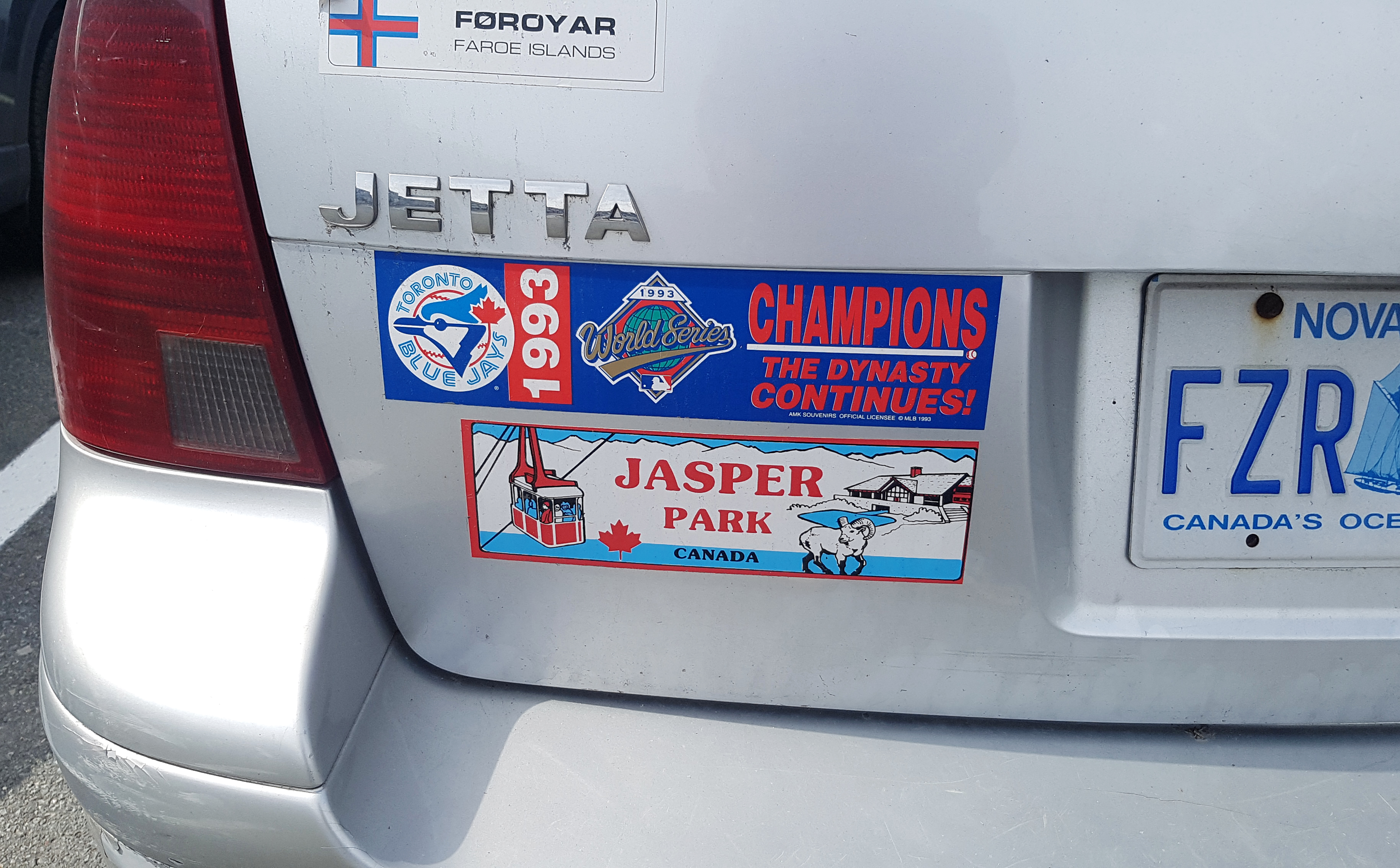
Toronto Blue Jays 1993 World Series Champions "The Dynasty Continues" Seen 25 years later in a Halifax, Nova Scotia, parking lot.

The 1993 Toronto Blue Jays season was the franchise's 17th season of Major League Baseball. It resulted in the Blue Jays finishing first in the American League East with a record of 95 wins and 67 losses. They were shut out only once (on June 30, by Fernando Valenzuela) in 162 regular-season games. The Blue Jays would repeat as World Series champions and become the first back-to-back champions since the 1977–1978 New York Yankees. The American League Championship Series would see the Blue Jays play the Chicago White Sox. After defeating the White Sox in six games, the Blue Jays would beat the Philadelphia Phillies in the World Series, also in six games.

This season marked the first time that a manager from the Blue Jays would manage the American League in the Major League Baseball All-Star Game. It was the 64th Mid-Summer Classic and was played on July 13 at Camden Yards in Baltimore with Cito Gaston leading the American League squad. John Olerud, Roberto Alomar, Joe Carter, and Paul Molitor were all starters for the American League. Pat Hentgen, Duane Ward and Devon White were named as reserves to the American League team. In the game, the American League defeated the National League by a score of 9–3. White, Alomar, Molitor, Carter and Olerud, batting first through fifth for most games, proved to be very strong offensively, and were nicknamed WAMCO. When Rickey Henderson joined the Jays on July 31, and was placed as the leadoff hitter, the nickname (now for the first six in the batting order) was then able to be spelled HWAMCO or HWACOM.

The Blue Jays would go on a 21-year playoff drought, not making the postseason again until the 2015 season. They were the last Toronto based team in a major professional sports league to win a championship until the Toronto Raptors won the 2019 NBA Finals. They would not return to the World Series until the 2025 season.

== Transactions ==
Transactions by the Toronto Blue Jays during the off-season before the 1993 season.

=== October 1992 ===
October 15	Butch Davis granted free agency (signed with Texas Rangers to a one-year, $130,000 on December 15, 1992). Terry McGriff granted free agency (signed with Florida Marlins to a contract on December 9, 1992).
October 24	Tom Henke granted free agency (signed with Texas Rangers to a two-year, $8 million contract on December 15, 1992).
October 26	Mike Maksudian selected by the Minnesota Twins off of waivers.
October 27	Jimmy Key granted free agency (signed with New York Yankees to a four-year, $17 million contract on December 10, 1992).
October 28	Dave Stieb granted free agency (signed with Chicago White Sox to a one-year, $300,000 contract on December 8, 1992). Pat Tabler granted free agency.
October 29	Mark Eichhorn granted free agency (signed with Toronto Blue Jays to a one-year, $850,000 contract on January 6, 1993). Alfredo Griffin granted free agency (signed with Toronto Blue Jays to a one-year, $500,000 contract on January 8, 1993). Rance Mulliniks granted free agency.
October 30	Joe Carter granted free agency (signed with Toronto Blue Jays to a three-year, $18.5 million contract on December 7, 1992). David Cone granted free agency (signed with Kansas City Royals to a three-year, $18 million contract on December 8, 1992). Candy Maldonado granted free agency (signed with Chicago Cubs to a two-year, $3.3 million contract on December 11, 1992).

=== November 1992 ===
November 2	Dave Winfield granted free agency (signed with Minnesota Twins to a two-year, $5.425 million contract on December 17, 1992).
November 4	Manny Lee granted free agency (signed with Texas Rangers to a two-year, $3.2 million contract on December 19, 1992).
November 17	Signed amateur free agent Beiker Graterol to a contract. Nigel Wilson selected by the Florida Marlins as the 2nd pick in the 1992 MLB expansion draft. David Weathers selected by the Florida Marlins as the 29th pick in the 1992 MLB expansion draft. Marcus Moore selected by the Colorado Rockies as the 56th pick in the 1992 MLB expansion draft.
November 27	Signed free agent Darnell Coles from the Cincinnati Reds to a two-year, $1 million contract.

=== December 1992 ===
December 7	Graeme Lloyd drafted by the Philadelphia Phillies in the 1992 MLB Rule 5 draft. Drafted Billy Taylor from the Atlanta Braves in the 1992 MLB Rule 5 draft. Re-signed free agent Joe Carter to a three-year, $18.5 million contract. Signed free agent Paul Molitor from the Milwaukee Brewers to a three-year, $12 million contract.
December 8	Signed free agent Danny Cox from the Pittsburgh Pirates to a one-year, $550,000 contract. Signed free agent Dave Stewart from the Oakland Athletics to a two-year, $8.5 million contract. Acquired Luis Sojo from the California Angels for Kelly Gruber.

=== January 1993 ===
January 6	Re-signed free agent Mark Eichhorn to a one-year, $850,000 contract.
January 8	Re-signed free agent Alfredo Griffin to a one-year, $500,000 contract.
January 11	Signed free agent Tony Castillo from the Detroit Tigers to a one-year, $185,000 contract.
January 15	Signed free agent Dick Schofield from the California Angels to a one-year, $800,000 contract.

=== March 1993 ===
March 16	Ricky Trlicek selected off of waviers by the Los Angeles Dodgers.
March 30	Player rights to Bob MacDonald sold to the Detroit Tigers. Released David Wells. Acquired Darrin Jackson from the San Diego Padres for Derek Bell and Stoney Briggs.

=== April 1993 ===
April 3	Returned Billy Taylor to the Atlanta Braves.

== Spring training ==
The Toronto Blue Jays spent their 17th spring training at Dunedin, Florida, while playing their home exhibition games at Dunedin Stadium at Grant Field for the 4th Spring training season.

== Regular season ==
=== Season standings ===
AL East
Team	W	L	Pct.	GB	Home	Road
Toronto Blue Jays	95	67	.586	—	48‍–‍33	47‍–‍34
New York Yankees	88	74	.543	7	50‍–‍31	38‍–‍43
Baltimore Orioles	85	77	.525	10	48‍–‍33	37‍–‍44
Detroit Tigers	85	77	.525	10	44‍–‍37	41‍–‍40
Boston Red Sox	80	82	.494	15	43‍–‍38	37‍–‍44
Cleveland Indians	76	86	.469	19	46‍–‍35	30‍–‍51
Milwaukee Brewers	69	93	.426	26	38‍–‍43	31‍–‍50

=== Record vs. opponents ===
	Record			Games Left		
Opponent	Home	Road	Total	Home	Road	Total
**AL East**
Baltimore Orioles	4–2	4–3	8–5	–	–	–
Boston Red Sox	6–1	4–2	10–3	–	–	–
Cleveland Indians	4–2	5–2	9–4	–	–	–
Detroit Tigers	4–3	3–3	7–6	–	–	–
Milwaukee Brewers	3–4	5–1	8–5	–	–	–
New York Yankees	4–2	4–3	8–5	–	–	–
**Totals**	**25–14**	**25–14**	**50–28**	–	–	–
**AL West**
California Angels	5–1	3–3	8–4	–	–	–
Chicago White Sox	3–3	3–3	6–6	–	–	–
Kansas City Royals	3–3	1–5	4–8	–	–	–
Minnesota Twins	5–1	5–1	10–2	–	–	–
Oakland Athletics	2–4	5–1	7–5	–	–	–
Seattle Mariners	3–3	2–4	5–7	–	–	–
Texas Rangers	2–4	3–3	5–7	–	–	–
**Totals**	**23–19**	**22–20**	**45–39**	–	–	–
**Grand Totals**	48–33	47–34	95–67	–	–	–

Month	Games	Won	Lost	Pct.
April	23	13	10	.565
May	28	16	12	.571
June	28	19	9	.679
July	26	12	14	.462
August	29	17	12	.586
September	25	17	8	.680
October	3	1	2	.333
**Totals**	**162**	**95**	**67**	**.586**

1993 American League record Source: MLB Standings Grid – 1993
Team	BAL	BOS	CAL	CWS	CLE	DET	KC	MIL	MIN	NYY	OAK	SEA	TEX	TOR
Baltimore	—	6–7	7–5	4–8	8–5	5–8	7–5	8–5	8–4	6–7	10–2	7–5	4–8	5–8
Boston	7–6	—	7–5	7–5	5–8	6–7	5–7	5–8	7–5	6–7	9–3	7–5	6–6	3–10
California	5–7	5–7	—	7–6	5–7	4–8	6–7	7–5	4–9	6–6	6–7	6–7	6–7	4–8
Chicago	8–4	5–7	6–7	—	9–3	7–5	6–7	9–3	10–3	4–8	7–6	9–4	8–5	6–6
Cleveland	5–8	8–5	7–5	3–9	—	6–7	7–5	8–5	4–8	6–7	8–4	3–9	7–5	4–9
Detroit	8–5	7–6	8–4	5–7	7–6	—	5–7	8–5	6–6	4–9	8–4	7–5	6–6	6–7
Kansas City	5–7	7–5	7–6	7–6	5–7	7–5	—	5–7	7–6	6–6	6–7	7–6	7–6	8–4
Milwaukee	5–8	8–5	5–7	3–9	5–8	5–8	7–5	—	7–5	4–9	7–5	4–8	4–8	5–8
Minnesota	4–8	5–7	9–4	3–10	8–4	6–6	6–7	5–7	—	4–8	8–5	4–9	7–6	2–10
New York	7–6	7–6	6–6	8–4	7–6	9–4	6–6	9–4	8–4	—	6–6	7–5	3–9	5–8
Oakland	2–10	3–9	7–6	6–7	4–8	4–8	7–6	5–7	5–8	6–6	—	9–4	5–8	5–7
Seattle	5–7	5–7	7–6	4–9	9–3	5–7	6–7	8–4	9–4	5–7	4–9	—	8–5	7–5
Texas	8–4	6–6	7–6	5–8	5–7	6–6	6–7	8–4	6–7	9–3	8–5	5–8	—	7–5
Toronto	8–5	10–3	8–4	6–6	9–4	7–6	4–8	8–5	10–2	8–5	7–5	5–7	5–7	—

=== Roster ===
1993 Toronto Blue Jays
**Roster**
**Pitchers**: 44 Scott Brow; 49 Tony Castillo; 50 Danny Cox; 46 Ken Dayley; 48 Mark Eichhorn; 32 Huck Flener; 66 Juan Guzmán; 41 Pat Hentgen; 28 Al Leiter; 26 Doug Linton; 47 Jack Morris; 34 Dave Stewart; 30 Todd Stottlemyre; 40 Mike Timlin; 31 Duane Ward; 54 Woody Williams	**Catchers**: 10 Pat Borders; 27 Randy Knorr; 6 Carlos Delgado; **Infielders**: 12 Roberto Alomar; 70 Domingo Cedeño; 1 Tony Fernández; 4 Alfredo Griffin; 5 Domingo Martínez; 9 John Olerud; 22 Dick Schofield; 13,2 Luis Sojo; 33 Ed Sprague	**Outfielders**: 2 Rob Butler; 21 Willie Cañate; 29 Joe Carter; 11 Darnell Coles; 56 Shawn Green; 14,24 Rickey Henderson; 14 Darrin Jackson; 24,16 Turner Ward; 25 Devon White; **Other batters**: 19 Paul Molitor	**Manager**: 43 Cito Gaston; **Coaches**: 3 Bob Bailor (first base); 42 Galen Cisco (pitching); 7 Rich Hacker (third base); 39 Larry Hisle (hitting); 45 Nick Leyva (third base); 8 John Sullivan (bullpen); 18 Gene Tenace (bench)

=== Transactions ===
Transactions for the Toronto Blue Jays during the 1993 regular season.

==== April 1993 ====
April 8	Signed free agent Lee Stevens from the Montreal Expos to a contract.
April 13	Purchased the contract of Willie Cañate from the Cincinnati Reds.
April 15	Released Ken Dayley.
April 25	Signed free agent Scott Bailes from the Kansas City Royals to a contract.

==== June 1993 ====
June 11	Acquired Tony Fernández from the New York Mets for Darrin Jackson.
June 17	Doug Linton selected off of waivers by the California Angels.

==== July 1993 ====
July 31	Acquired Rickey Henderson from the Oakland Athletics for Steve Karsay and a player to be named later (José Herrera on August 6, 1993).

==== August 1993 ====
August 12	Signed free agent Randy St. Claire from the Seattle Mariners to a contract. Signed free agent Matt Young from the Cleveland Indians to a contract.

==== September 1993 ====
September 8	Released Matt Young.

=== Game log ===
1993 regular season game log: 95–67 (Home: 48–33; Road: 47–34)
April: 13–10 (Home: 9–4; Road: 4–6)

#	Date	Time (ET)	Opponent	Score	Win	Loss	Save	Time of Game	Attendance	Record	Streak
1	April 6	10:44 p.m.	@ Mariners	1–8	Johnson (1–0)	**Morris** (0–1)	–	2:41	56,120	0–1	L1
2	April 7	12:41 p.m.	@ Mariners	2–0	**Leiter** (1–0)	Bosio (0–1)	**Ward** (1)	2:17	27,837	1–1	W1
3	April 9	4:03 p.m.	Indians	13–10	**Eichhorn** (1–0)	Power (0–1)	**Ward** (2)	3:11	50,533	2–1	W2
4	April 10	1:35 p.m.	Indians	5–4	**Stottlemyre** (1–0)	Nagy (0–2)	**Ward** (3)	2:10	50,492	3–1	W3
5	April 11	1:05 p.m.	Indians	6–10	Clark (1–0)	**Morris** (0–2)	Lilliquist (2)	2:44	47,194	3–2	L1
6	April 13	7:37 p.m.	Mariners	6–5	**Cox** (1–0)	Leary (0–1)	**Ward** (4)	2:38	42,230	4–2	W1
7	April 14	7:36 p.m.	Mariners	9–10 (10)	DeLucia (1–0)	**Hentgen** (0–1)	Charlton (1)	3:52	43,054	4–3	L1
8	April 15	12:36 p.m.	Mariners	3–1	**Stottlemyre** (2–0)	Cummings (0–2)	**Ward** (5)	2:27	46,272	5–3	W1
9	April 16	7:09 p.m.	@ Indians	1–13	Nagy (1–2)	**Morris** (0–3)	–	2:26	17,428	5–4	L1
10	April 17	1:34 p.m.	@ Indians	8–1	**Hentgen** (1–1)	Clark (1–1)	–	3:13	21,755	6–4	W1
11	April 18	1:35 p.m.	@ Indians	5–6	Mutis (1–1)	**Leiter** (1–1)	Lilliquist (3)	2:27	24,368	6–5	L1
12	April 19	1:35 p.m.	@ Indians	7–1	**Guzmán** (1–0)	Bielecki (1–2)	–	2:51	11,750	7–5	W1
13	April 20	8:35 p.m.	@ Royals	2–8	Appier (1–2)	**Stottlemyre** (2–1)	–	2:19	14,985	7–6	L1
14	April 21	8:35 p.m.	@ Royals	5–6	Montgomery (1–0)	**Timlin** (0–1)	–	2:32	15,693	7–7	L2
15	April 22	8:35 p.m.	@ Royals	6–3	**Hentgen** (2–1)	Cone (0–4)	–	2:44	19,369	8–7	W1
16	April 23	7:38 p.m.	White Sox	4–5	McCaskill (1–2)	**Leiter** (1–2)	Hernández (3)	2:38	50,494	8–8	L1
17	April 24	1:35 p.m.	White Sox	10–4	**Guzmán** (2–0)	Bolton (0–3)	–	2:58	50,518	9–8	W1
18	April 25	3:04 p.m.	White Sox	1–0	**Stottlemyre** (3–1)	Fernandez (2–2)	**Ward** (6)	2:13	50,430	10–8	W2
19	April 26	7:35 p.m.	Rangers	8–6	**Morris** (1–3)	Lefferts (1–4)	**Ward** (7)	3:11	47,368	11–8	W3
20	April 27	7:35 p.m.	Rangers	4–3	**Hentgen** (3–1)	Nen (0–1)	**Ward** (8)	2:37	49,021	12–8	W4
21	April 28	7:35 p.m.	Royals	3–5	Gardner (2–1)	**Brow** (0–1)	Montgomery (6)	2:30	49,073	12–9	L1
22	April 29	12:30 p.m.	Royals	8–0	**Guzmán** (3–0)	Pichardo (1–1)	–	2:48	49,114	13–9	W1
23	April 30	8:07 p.m.	@ White Sox	2–10	Fernandez (3–2)	**Stottlemyre** (3–2)	–	2:40	29,497	13–10	L1

May: 16–12 (Home: 7–6; Road: 9–6)

#	Date	Time (ET)	Opponent	Score	Win	Loss	Save	Time of Game	Attendance	Record	Streak
24	May 1	7:05 p.m.	@ White Sox	2–8	Álvarez (2–0)	**Morris** (1–4)	–	2:49	35,378	13–11	L2
25	May 2	2:37 p.m.	@ White Sox	6–1	**Hentgen** (4–1)	McDowell (5–1)	**Cox** (1)	2:30	25,715	14–11	W1
26	May 4	8:35 p.m.	@ Rangers	2–3	Bohanon (1–0)	**Ward** (0–1)	Henke (5)	2:55	20,354	14–12	L1
27	May 5	8:35 p.m.	@ Rangers	1–7	Rogers (3–1)	**Stottlemyre** (3–3)	–	2:42	16,159	14–13	L2
28	May 6	7:35 p.m.	Orioles	10–8	**Cox** (2–0)	McDonald (2–3)	**Ward** (9)	3:23	50,505	15–13	W1
29	May 7	7:36 p.m.	Orioles	3–2	**Eichhorn** (2–0)	Frohwirth (1–2)	–	2:36	50,498	16–13	W2
30	May 8	1:15 p.m.	Orioles	3–6	Sutcliffe (3–2)	**Linton** (0–1)	Frohwirth (2)	3:00	50,507	16–14	L1
31	May 9	1:35 p.m.	Orioles	3–4	Williamson (1–1)	**Ward** (0–2)	Olson (6)	3:17	50,473	16–15	L2
32	May 11	7:36 p.m.	Tigers	7–12	Gullickson (1–0)	**Stottlemyre** (3–4)	–	3:03	50,493	16–16	L3
33	May 12	7:37 p.m.	Tigers	8–13	Krueger (3–1)	**Hentgen** (4–2)	Henneman (7)	3:42	50,488	16–17	L4
34	May 13	7:36 p.m.	Tigers	6–5	**Castillo** (1–0)	MacDonald (3–1)	–	3:25	50,507	17–17	W1
35	May 14	7:38 p.m.	@ Yankees	8–6	**Ward** (1–2)	Monteleone (3–3)	–	3:34	27,733	18–17	W2
36	May 15	1:35 p.m.	@ Yankees	3–4	Pérez (2–2)	**Leiter** (1–3)	Farr (8)	2:30	31,372	18–18	L1
37	May 16	1:35 p.m.	@ Yankees	12–6	**Stottlemyre** (4–4)	Witt (2–1)	–	3:09	31,583	19–18	W1
38	May 17	7:37 p.m.	@ Red Sox	9–3	**Hentgen** (5–2)	Clemens (5–3)	–	2:56	30,057	20–18	W2
—	May 18	7:35 p.m.	@ Red Sox	**Postponed (Rain)** (Makeup date: May 20)							
39	May 19	7:39 p.m.	@ Red Sox	5–10	Darwin (4–4)	**Stewart** (0–1)	–	2:39	27,465	20–19	L1
40	May 20	6:13 p.m.	@ Red Sox	4–3	**Cox** (3–0)	Quantrill (2–3)	**Ward** (10)	3:26	18,219	21–19	W1
41	May 21	7:37 p.m.	Twins	11–2	**Morris** (2–4)	Deshaies (5–3)	–	2:35	50,480	22–19	W2
42	May 22	1:36 p.m.	Twins	7–0	**Cox** (4–0)	Tapani (2–5)	–	2:40	50,510	23–19	W3
43	May 23	1:38 p.m.	Twins	2–1	**Hentgen** (6–2)	Erickson (2–6)	**Ward** (11)	2:34	50,499	24–19	W4
44	May 24	1:37 p.m.	Brewers	4–1	**Stewart** (1–1)	Boddicker (3–3)	**Ward** (12)	2:02	50,494	25–19	W5
45	May 25	7:34 p.m.	Brewers	4–2	**Guzmán** (4–0)	Wegman (3–7)	**Ward** (13)	2:30	50,504	26–19	W6
46	May 26	7:36 p.m.	Brewers	1–8	Navarro (3–3)	**Morris** (2–5)	–	2:38	50,483	26–20	L1
47	May 27	12:36 p.m.	Brewers	3–9	Bones (2–2)	**Leiter** (1–4)	–	2:33	50,487	26–21	L2
48	May 28	9:18 p.m.	@ Athletics	2–3	Witt (5–2)	**Cox** (4–1)	Honeycutt (1)	3:01	30,351	26–22	L3
49	May 29	4:07 p.m.	@ Athletics	5–3	**Stewart** (2–1)	Welch (4–4)	**Ward** (14)	3:20	30,467	27–22	W1
50	May 30	4:06 p.m.	@ Athletics	13–11	**Cox** (5–1)	Mohler (0–1)	**Ward** (15)	3:43	28,167	28–22	W2
51	May 31	4:05 p.m.	@ Angels	10–5	**Morris** (3–5)	Farrell (2–6)	–	3:04	30,620	29–22	W3

June: 19–9 (Home: 10–3; Road: 9–6)

#	Date	Time (ET)	Opponent	Score	Win	Loss	Save	Time of Game	Attendance	Record	Streak
52	June 1	10:07 p.m.	@ Angels	8–0	**Leiter** (2–4)	Sanderson (7–3)	–	2:45	18,198	30–22	W4
53	June 2	10:05 p.m.	@ Angels	7–6	**Hentgen** (7–2)	Valera (3–4)	**Ward** (16)	3:24	24,360	31–22	W5
54	June 4	7:36 p.m.	Athletics	4–3 (12)	**Williams** (1–0)	Gossage (3–2)	–	4:18	50,507	32–22	W6
55	June 5	1:37 p.m.	Athletics	9–5	**Guzmán** (5–0)	Hillegas (2–5)	–	3:04	50,514	33–22	W7
56	June 6	1:35 p.m.	Athletics	3–10	Darling (1–3)	**Morris** (3–6)	–	3:00	50,505	33–23	L1
57	June 7	7:35 p.m.	Angels	4–2	**Leiter** (3–4)	Sanderson (7–4)	**Ward** (17)	2:28	49,177	34–23	W1
58	June 8	7:35 p.m.	Angels	14–6	**Williams** (2–0)	Valera (3–5)	–	3:05	49,112	35–23	W2
59	June 9	7:35 p.m.	Angels	4–6	Langston (7–1)	**Stewart** (2–2)	Frey (6)	2:56	50,503	35–24	L1
60	June 10	7:10 p.m.	@ Tigers	3–5	Doherty (6–2)	**Guzmán** (5–1)	MacDonald (3)	3:14	27,551	35–25	L2
61	June 11	7:07 p.m	@ Tigers	1–6	Gullickson (4–2)	**Morris** (3–7)	–	2:43	39,654	35–26	L3
62	June 12	7:07 p.m.	@ Tigers	1–12	Moore (4–3)	**Leiter** (3–5)	–	2:56	47,086	35–27	L4
63	June 13	1:37 p.m.	@ Tigers	13–4	**Hentgen** (8–2)	Leiter (6–2)	–	3:33	44,032	36–27	W1
64	June 14	8:05 p.m.	@ Twins	3–4	Casian (1–0)	**Cox** (5–2)	Willis (1)	2:54	27,887	36–28	L1
65	June 15	8:05 p.m.	@ Twins	6–3	**Guzmán** (6–1)	Tapani (3–7)	**Ward** (18)	2:26	31,759	37–28	W1
66	June 16	1:17 p.m.	@ Twins	4–0	**Morris** (4–7)	Erickson (3–7)	–	2:16	30,326	38–28	W2
67	June 17	7:35 p.m.	Red Sox	7–0	**Leiter** (4–5)	Quantrill (2–5)	–	2:49	50,528	39–28	W3
68	June 18	7:35 p.m.	Red Sox	11–2	**Hentgen** (9–2)	Clemens (7–6)	–	2:54	50,509	40–28	W4
69	June 19	1:35 p.m.	Red Sox	9–4	**Stewart** (3–2)	Darwin (5–7)	–	2:41	50,510	41–28	W5
70	June 20	1:35 p.m.	Red Sox	3–2 (12)	**Timlin** (1–1)	Russell (0–1)	–	4:06	50,520	42–28	W6
71	June 22	7:35 p.m.	Yankees	5–4	**Williams** (3–0)	Howe (2–2)	**Ward** (19)	2:42	50,513	43–28	W7
72	June 23	7:35 p.m.	Yankees	3–4	Key (9–2)	**Stottlemyre** (4–5)	Farr (18)	2:50	50,520	43–29	L1
73	June 24	7:35 p.m.	Yankees	7–2	**Hentgen** (10–2)	Kamieniecki (2–2)	–	2:45	50,516	44–29	W1
74	June 25	8:09 p.m.	@ Brewers	5–6	Fetters (1–0)	**Cox** (5–3)	–	3:12	39,308	44–30	L1
75	June 26	8:08 p.m.	@ Brewers	3–2	**Guzmán** (7–1)	Eldred (9–8)	**Ward** (20)	2:09	45,173	45–30	W1
76	June 27	2:07 p.m.	@ Brewers	5–4	**Morris** (5–7)	Wegman (4–13)	**Ward** (21)	2:47	45,580	46–30	W2
77	June 28	7:41 p.m.	@ Orioles	7–2	**Stottlemyre** (5–5)	Sutcliffe (8–3)	**Leiter** (1)	2:50	46,606	47–30	W3
78	June 29	7:39 p.m.	@ Orioles	2–1	**Hentgen** (11–2)	McDonald (4–7)	**Ward** (22)	3:10	46,408	48–30	W4
79	June 30	7:37 p.m.	@ Orioles	0–6	Valenzuela (3–7)	**Stewart** (3–3)	–	2:44	46,409	48–31	L1

July: 13–15 (Home: 7–9; Road: 6–6)

#	Date	Time (ET)	Opponent	Score	Win	Loss	Save	Time of Game	Attendance	Record	Streak
80	July 2	8:42 p.m.	@ Royals	2–3	Gubicza (1–6)	**Cox** (5–4)	–	3:01	23,832	48–32	L2
81	July 3	8:08 p.m.	@ Royals	2–3	Cone (6–8)	**Morris** (5–8)	Montgomery (24)	2:37	28,060	48–33	L3
82	July 4	8:07 p.m.	@ Royals	1–3	Haney (5–1)	**Stottlemyre** (5–6)	Montgomery (25)	2:29	40,329	48–34	L4
83	July 5	7:37 p.m.	White Sox	3–4	Álvarez (8–4)	**Hentgen** (11–3)	Hernández (16)	2:53	50,508	48–35	L5
84	July 6	7:35 p.m.	White Sox	5–1	**Stewart** (4–3)	McDowell (12–6)	–	2:47	50,505	49–35	W1
85	July 7	7:36 p.m.	White Sox	2–5	Fernandez (10–4)	**Guzmán** (7–2)	Hernández (17)	3:03	50,517	49–36	L1
86	July 8	7:35 p.m.	Rangers	1–6	Rogers (6–6)	**Morris** (5–9)	–	2:44	50,525	49–37	L2
87	July 9	7:37 p.m.	Rangers	2–4	Pavlik (5–4)	**Stottlemyre** (5–7)	Henke (16)	2:51	50,506	49–38	L3
88	July 10	1:37 p.m.	Rangers	7–10	Lefferts (2–7)	**Hentgen** (11–4)	Henke (17)	3:17	50,508	49–39	L4
89	July 11	1:37 p.m.	Rangers	6–11	Leibrandt (9–4)	**Stewart** (4–4)	–	2:52	50,516	49–40	L5
**64th All-Star Game in Baltimore, Maryland**
90	July 15	7:37 p.m.	Royals	7–2	**Leiter** (5–5)	Burgos (0–1)	–	3:05	50,503	50–40	W1
91	July 16	7:37 p.m.	Royals	3–7	Haney (6–2)	**Morris** (5–10)	Montgomery (26)	2:37	50,531	50–41	L1
92	July 17	1:05 p.m.	Royals	4–5	Gubicza (3–6)	**Cox** (5–5)	Montgomery (27)	3:07	50,512	50–42	L2
93	July 18	1:36 p.m.	Royals	4–3	**Hentgen** (12–4)	Pichardo (4–6)	–	2:10	50,524	51–42	W1
94	July 19	8:06 p.m.	@ White Sox	15–7	**Stewart** (5–4)	Bolton (1–6)	–	2:58	40,127	52–42	W1
95	July 20	8:07 }p.m.	@ White Sox	1–2	Fernandez (12–4)	**Guzmán** (7–3)	–	2:11	30,454	52–43	L1
96	July 21	8:37 p.m.	@ White Sox	4–1	**Leiter** (6–5)	Álvarez (8–6)	**Ward** (23)	3:08	30,900	53–43	W1
97	July 22	8:35 p.m.	@ Rangers	8–7	**Timlin** (2–1)	Carpenter (0–1)	**Ward** (24)	3:24	38,198	54–43	W2
98	July 23	8:37 p.m.	@ Rangers	5–6	Lefferts (3–7)	**Hentgen** (12–5)	Henke (21)	3:29	38,124	54–44	L1
99	July 24	8:35 p.m.	@ Rangers	5–1	**Stewart** (6–4)	Leibrandt (9–6)	**Ward** (25)	2:39	38,457	55–44	W1
100	July 25	8:08 p.m.	@ Rangers	9–7	**Timlin** (3–1)	Henke (4–3)	**Ward** (26)	3:23	40,277	56–44	W2
101	July 27	7:34 p.m.	Orioles	6–5	**Ward** (2–2)	Poole (1–1)	–	2:56	50,513	57–44	W3
102	July 28	7:36 p.m.	Orioles	5–4 (10)	**Castillo** (2–0)	Williamson (5–2)	–	2:52	50,523	58–44	W4
103	July 29	7:35 p.m.	Tigers	7–4	**Castillo** (3–0)	Bolton (1–4)	**Ward** (27)	3:12	50,528	59–44	W5
104	July 30	7:35 p.m.	Tigers	5–8	Moore (7–5)	**Stewart** (6–5)	Henneman (17)	3:07	50,511	59–45	L1
105	July 31	1:15 p.m	Tigers	3–1	**Timlin** (4–1)	Wells (10–7)	**Ward** (28)	3:42	50,532	60–45	W1

August: 13–10 (Home: 7–6; Road: 6–4)

#	Date	Time (ET)	Opponent	Score	Win	Loss	Save	Time of Game	Attendance	Record	Streak
106	August 1	1:35 p.m.	Tigers	2–1	**Morris** (6–10)	Henneman (2–2)	–	2:36	50,522	61–45	W2
107	August 2	7:40 p.m.	@ Yankees	4–0	**Stottlemyre** (6–7)	Abbott (8–9)	**Cox** (2)	2:36	43,304	62–45	W3
108	August 3	7:37 p.m.	@ Yankees	8–6	**Hentgen** (13–5)	Muñoz (2–2)	**Leiter** (2)	3:29	48,031	63–45	W4
109	August 4	7:37 p.m.	@ Yankees	2–6	Kamieniecki (7–3)	**Stewart** (6–6)	–	3:02	48,250	63–46	L1
110	August 5	1:05 p.m.	@ Yankees	4–5	Key (13–4)	**Leiter** (6–6)	–	2:54	52,493	63–47	L2
111	August 6	7:38 p.m.	Brewers	11–10 (11)	**Leiter** (7–6)	Henry (2–4)	–	4:15	50,517	64–47	W1
112	August 7	1:30 p.m.	Brewers	1–7	Miranda (1–2)	**Stottlemyre** (6–8)		2:52	50,506	64–48	L1
113	August 8	8:08 p.m.	Brewers	2–5	Bones (7–8)	**Hentgen** (13–6)	–	2:46	50,510	64–49	L2
114	August 10	7:37 p.m.	Twins	6–3	**Stewart** (7–6)	Erickson (6–14)	**Ward** (29)	2:35	50,530	65–49	W1
115	August 11	7:35 p.m.	Twins	4–2	**Guzmán** (8–3)	Deshaies (11–10)	**Ward** (30)	2:39	50,525	66–49	W2
116	August 12	12:37 p.m.	Twins	2–9	Tapani (7–11)	**Morris** (6–11)	–	2:47	50,527	66–50	L1
117	August 13	7:35 p.m.	@ Red Sox	3–5	Darwin (12–8)	**Stottlemyre** (6–9)	Russell (32)	2:55	34,276	66–51	L2
118	August 14	1:07 p.m.	@ Red Sox	5–2	**Hentgen** (14–6)	Dopson (7–8)	**Ward** (31)	3:14	33,924	67–51	W1
119	August 15	1:08 p.m.	@ Red Sox	9–1	**Stewart** (8–6)	Clemens (9–10)	–	3:05	33,380	68–51	W2
120	August 16	7:05 p.m.	@ Indians	4–1	**Guzmán** (9–3)	Ojeda (0–1)	**Ward** (32)	2:49	25,546	69–51	W3
121	August 17	7:35 p.m.	@ Indians	6–4	**Morris** (7–11)	Kramer (5–3)	**Ward** (33)	3:04	40,253	70–51	W4
122	August 18	7:06 p.m.	@ Indians	7–6 (11)	**Cox** (6–5)	Lilliquist (2–2)	**Ward** (34)	3:44	24,003	71–51	W5
123	August 20	7:35 p.m.	Mariners	1–4	Johnson (13–8)	**Hentgen** (14–7)	–	2:35	50,527	71–52	L1
124	August 21	1:38 p.m.	Mariners	2–5	Fleming (9–2)	**Stewart** (8–7)	Power (5)	3:00	50,519	71–53	L2
125	August 22	1:35 p.m.	Mariners	12–7	**Guzmán** (10–3)	Ontiveros (0–1)	–	3:07	50,511	72–53	W1
126	August 23	7:35 p.m.	Indians	8–9	Hernandez (4–2)	**Eichhorn** (2–1)	DiPoto (4)	3:18	50,518	72–54	L1
127	August 24	7:37 p.m.	Indians	8–6	**Stottlemyre** (7–9)	Tavárez (2–2)	**Ward** (35)	2:45	50,511	73–54	W1
128	August 25	12:35 p.m.	Indians	10–7	**Hentgen** (15–7)	Mesa (9–10)	**Ward** (36)	3:07	50,525	74–54	W2
129	August 26	10:06 p.m.	@ Mariners	3–6	Johnson (14–8)	**Stewart** (8–8)	Power (6)	2:35	28,463	74–55	L1
130	August 27	10:38 p.m.	@ Mariners	6–7	Nelson (4–3)	**Williams** (3–1)	Plantenberg (1)	2:55	31,771	74–56	L2
131	August 28	10:07 p.m.	@ Mariners	1–2	Bosio (7–7)	**Cox** (6–6)	Power (7)	2:27	56,076	74–57	L3
132	August 29	4:38 p.m.	@ Mariners	6–2	**Stottlemyre** (8–9)	Hanson (10–11)	–	2:44	34,593	75–57	W1
133	August 30	10:05 p.m.	@ Athletics	4–2	**Hentgen** (16–7)	Darling (5–7)	**Ward** (37)	2:39	24,371	76–57	W2
134	August 31	10:36 p.m.	@ Athletics	3–2 (10)	**Cox** (7–6)	Eckersley (2–2)	**Ward** (38)	3:18	21,334	77–57	W3

September: 17–8 (Home: 7–5; Road: 10–3)

#	Date	Time (ET)	Opponent	Score	Win	Loss	Save	Time of Game	Attendance	Record	Streak
135	September 1	3:15 p.m.	@ Athletics	8–3	**Guzmán** (11–3)	Mohler (1–6)	–	2:59	24,251	78–57	W4
136	September 3	10:35 p.m.	@ Angels	1–4	Langston (15–6)	**Morris** (7–12)	Grahe (7)	2:37	23,834	78–58	L1
137	September 4	10:05 p.m.	@ Angels	2–4	Magrane (1–1)	**Stottlemyre** (8–10)	Frey (12)	2:29	21,530	78–59	L2
138	September 5	4:05 p.m.	@ Angels	1–5	Leftwich (2–4)	**Hentgen** (16–8)	–	2:29	19,653	78–60	L3
139	September 7	7:38 p.m.	Athletics	7–11 (11)	Honeycutt (1–4)	**Castillo** (3–1)	–	3:45	50,515	78–61	L4
140	September 8	7:36 p.m.	Athletics	1–2	Witt (10–12)	**Ward** (2–3)	Eckersley (30)	2:59	50,329	78–62	L5
141	September 9	7:35 p.m.	Athletics	4–7	Smithberg (1–0)	**Castillo** (3–2)	Eckersley (31)	3:18	50,518	78–63	L6
142	September 10	7:35 p.m.	Angels	10–4	**Stottlemyre** (9–10)	Leftwich (2–5)	–	2:55	50,522	79–63	W1
143	September 11	1:35 p.m.	Angels	9–5	**Hentgen** (17–8)	Hathaway (4–3)	–	2:51	50,529	80–63	W2
144	September 12	1:38 p.m.	Angels	4–1	**Stewart** (9–8)	Finley (14–12)	**Ward** (39)	2:48	50,523	81–63	W3
145	September 14	7:37 p.m.	@ Tigers	9–5	**Guzmán** (12–3)	Davis (2–7)	–	3:38	23,674	82–63	W4
146	September 15	7:06 p.m.	@ Tigers	14–8	**Stottlemyre** (10–10)	Moore (12–9)	**Ward** (40)	4:12	24,526	83–63	W5
147	September 17	8:06 p.m.	@ Twins	4–2	**Hentgen** (18–8)	Tapani (9–15)	**Ward** (41)	2:32	24,113	84–63	W6
148	September 18	12:07 p.m.	@ Twins	5–1	**Stewart** (10–8)	Erickson (8–19)	**Timlin** (1)	2:48	26,415	85–63	W7
149	September 19	2:09 p.m.	@ Twins	10–0	**Guzmán** (13–3)	Trombley (5–5)	–	3:00	23,775	86–63	W8
150	September 21	7:35 p.m.	Red Sox	5–0	**Stottlemyre** (11–10)	Clemens (11–14)	–	2:25	50,524	87–63	W9
151	September 22	7:35 p.m.	Red Sox	5–7 (10)	Ryan (6–2)	**Timlin** (4–2)	–	3:31	50,532	87–64	L1
152	September 23	7:39 p.m.	Red Sox	5–1	**Stewart** (11–8)	Minchey (1–1)	–	2:21	50,528	88–64	W1
153	September 24	7:36 p.m.	Yankees	7–3	**Guzmán** (14–3)	Key (17–6)	–	3:09	50,517	89–64	W2
154	September 25	1:37 p.m.	Yankees	3–1	**Leiter** (8–6)	Tanana (0–2)	**Ward** (42)	3:00	50,527	90–64	W3
155	September 26	1:36 p.m.	Yankees	3–7	Abbott (11–13)	**Stottlemyre** (11–11)	–	2:46	50,518	90–65	L1
156	September 27	8:07 p.m.	@ Brewers	2–0	**Hentgen** (19–8)	Eldred (16–16)	**Ward** (43)	2:53	14,931	91–65	W1
157	September 28	8:09 p.m.	@ Brewers	6–4	**Stewart** (12–8)	Maysey (1–2)	**Ward** (44)	3:00	13,182	92–65	W2
158	September 29	8:08 p.m.	@ Brewers	9–6	**Eichhorn** (3–1)	Orosco (3–5)	**Ward** (45)	3:15	13,508	93–65	W3
159	September 30	8:05 p.m.	@ Orioles	6–2	**Leiter** (9–6)	Rhodes (5–6)		2:59	45,653	94–65	W4

October: 1–2 (Home: 0–0; Road: 1–2)

#	Date	Time (ET)	Opponent	Score	Win	Loss	Save	Time of Game	Attendance	Record	Streak
160	October 1	7:39 p.m.	@ Orioles	2–7	Valenzuela (8–10)	**Stottlemyre** (11–12)	–	2:57	45,881	94–66	L1
161	October 2	7:06 p.m.	@ Orioles	4–8	Sutcliffe (10–10)	**Hentgen** (19–9)	Mills (4)	2:44	46,094	94–67	L2
162	October 3	1:40 p.m.	@ Orioles	11–6	**Brow** (1–1)	McDonald (13–14)	–	3:04	45,913	95–67	W1

Legend: = Win = Loss = Postponement
Bold = Blue Jays team member

== Player stats ==
= Indicates team leader

= Indicates league leader

=== Batting ===
==== Starters by position ====
Note: Pos = Position; G = Games played; AB = At bats; H = Hits; Avg. = Batting average; HR = Home runs; RBI = Runs batted in

Pos	Player	G	AB	H	Avg.	HR	RBI
C	Pat Borders	138	488	124	.254	9	55
1B	John Olerud	158	551	200	.363	24	107
2B	Roberto Alomar	153	589	192	.326	17	93
3B	Ed Sprague	150	546	142	.260	12	73
SS	Tony Fernández	94	353	108	.306	4	50
LF	Rickey Henderson	44	163	35	.215	4	12
CF	Devon White	146	598	163	.273	15	52
RF	Joe Carter	155	603	153	.254	33	121
DH	Paul Molitor	160	636	211	.332	22	111

- October 3, 1993: On the last day of the regular season, Roberto Alomar raised his batting average to .326, moving from fourth to third in the American League batting race; with John Olerud (.363) and Paul Molitor (.332) already first and second, respectively, this marked the first time in 100 years that the top three hitters in the league were from the same team;

==== Other batters ====
Note: G = Games played; AB = At bats; H = Hits; Avg. = Batting average; HR = Home runs; RBI = Runs batted in

Player	G	AB	H	Avg.	HR	RBI
Darnell Coles	64	194	49	.253	4	26
Darrin Jackson	46	176	38	.216	5	19
Turner Ward	72	167	32	.192	4	28
Dick Schofield	36	110	21	.191	0	5
Randy Knorr	39	101	25	.248	4	20
Alfredo Griffin	46	95	20	.211	0	3
Rob Butler	17	48	13	.271	0	2
Willie Cañate	38	47	10	.213	1	3
Luis Sojo	19	47	8	.170	0	6
Domingo Cedeno	15	46	8	.174	0	7
Domingo Martinez	8	14	4	.286	1	3
Shawn Green	3	6	0	.000	0	0
Carlos Delgado	2	1	0	.000	0	0

=== Pitching ===
==== Starting pitchers ====
Note: G = Games pitched; IP = Innings pitched; W = Wins; L = Losses; ERA = Earned run average; SO = Strikeouts

Player	G	IP	W	L	ERA	SO
Juan Guzmán	33	221	14	3	3.99	194
Pat Hentgen	34	216 1/3	19	9	3.87	122
Todd Stottlemyre	30	176 2/3	11	12	4.84	98
Dave Stewart	26	162	12	8	4.44	96
Jack Morris	27	152 2/3	7	12	6.19	103

==== Other pitchers ====
Note: G = Games pitched; IP = Innings pitched; W = Wins; L = Losses; ERA = Earned run average; SO = Strikeouts

Player	G	IP	W	L	ERA	SO
Al Leiter	34	105	9	6	4.11	66
Woody Williams	30	37	3	1	4.38	24
Scott Brow	6	18	1	1	6.00	7
Doug Linton	4	11	0	1	6.55	4
Huck Flener	6	6 2/3	0	0	4.05	2
Ken Dayley	2	2/3	0	0	0.00	2

==== Relief pitchers ====
Note; G = Games pitched; IP = Innings pitched; W = Wins; L = Losses; SV = Saves; ERA = Earned run average; SO = Strikeouts

Player	G	IP	W	L	SV	ERA	SO
Duane Ward	71	71 2/3	2	3	45	2.13	97
Danny Cox	44	83 2/3	7	6	2	3.12	87
Mark Eichhorn	54	72 2/3	3	1	0	2.72	47
Mike Timlin	54	55 2/3	4	2	1	4.69	49
Tony Castillo	51	50 2/3	3	2	0	3.38	28

== American League Championship Series ==
=== Game 1 ===
October 5, Comiskey Park

Team	1	2	3	4	5	6	7	8	9	R	H	E
Toronto	0	0	0	2	3	0	2	0	0	7	17	1
Chicago	0	0	0	3	0	0	0	0	X	3	6	1
W: Juan Guzmán (1–0) L: Jack McDowell (0–1)
HRs: TOR – Paul Molitor (1)

The ALCS opened at Comiskey Park with a battle of aces, as Toronto threw Juan Guzmán against Chicago's Jack McDowell, the eventual 1993 American League Cy Young Award winner. The game was scoreless until the top of the fourth, when Jays third baseman Ed Sprague stroked a triple to right field that scored John Olerud and Paul Molitor. The White Sox took a 3–2 lead in the bottom of the fourth with RBI base hits by Ozzie Guillén and Tim Raines, but Toronto stormed back in its half of the fifth with a two-run double by Olerud and a run-scoring single by Molitor. The Jays' designated hitter added a two-run homer in the seventh that finally chased McDowell, and the Chicago batters could muster nothing more against Toronto's bullpen as the Jays took the game 7–3 and a 1–0 lead in the series.

=== Game 2 ===
October 6, Comiskey Park

Team	1	2	3	4	5	6	7	8	9	R	H	E
Toronto	1	0	0	2	0	0	0	0	0	3	8	0
Chicago	1	0	0	0	0	0	0	0	0	1	7	2
W: Dave Stewart (1–0) L: Alex Fernandez (0–1) SV: Duane Ward (1)
HRs: None

In Game 2, the Jays' Dave Stewart faced off against the Sox' Alex Fernandez. Toronto struck in the first when Rickey Henderson reached on an error by Dan Pasqua and later scored on a fielder's choice by Roberto Alomar, but the Pale Hose tied the game in the bottom of the inning when Stewart walked the bases loaded and then unleashed a wild pitch, scoring Raines. The contest remained knotted at one-all until the top of the fourth, when the Jays touched Fernandez for two runs via singles by Tony Fernández and Pat Borders. As in the first game, the ChiSox could not solve Toronto's relievers, and Duane Ward (who had notched a league-leading 45 saves during the regular season) secured his first playoff save as the Jays took a 2–0 lead in the series with a 3–1 victory.

=== Game 3 ===
October 8, SkyDome

Team	1	2	3	4	5	6	7	8	9	R	H	E
Chicago	0	0	5	1	0	0	0	0	0	6	12	0
Toronto	0	0	1	0	0	0	0	0	0	1	7	1
W: Wilson Álvarez (1–0) L: Pat Hentgen (0–1)
HRs: None

The series shifted north of the border for Game 3, featuring Chicago's Wilson Álvarez taking on Toronto's Pat Hentgen. The two starters traded zeroes until the South Siders erupted with a five-run third, including a pair of two-run singles by Ellis Burks and Lance Johnson. The Blue Jays got a run in the bottom half of the frame when Henderson doubled, stole third, and scored on a Devon White single, but Hentgen was pulled in the fourth after giving up back-to-back base hits. His replacement on the mound, Danny Cox, gave up another run when a Robin Ventura sacrifice fly plated Guillén. This was more than enough for Alvarez, who went the distance as the Pale Hose cut Toronto's series lead to 2–1.

=== Game 4 ===
October 9, SkyDome

Team	1	2	3	4	5	6	7	8	9	R	H	E
Chicago	0	2	0	0	0	3	1	0	1	7	11	0
Toronto	0	0	3	0	0	1	0	0	0	4	9	0
W: Tim Belcher (1–0) L: Todd Stottlemyre (0–1) SV: Roberto Hernández (1)
HRs: CHI – Frank Thomas (1), Lance Johnson (1)

In the fourth game, the ChiSox sent Jason Bere to the hill against the Jays' Todd Stottlemyre. The South Siders took a 2–0 lead in the top of the second thanks to a home run by Johnson, but Toronto came back in the third with an RBI double from Alomar and a two-run single by Joe Carter, after which Pale Hose skipper Gene Lamont yanked Bere and replaced him with Tim Belcher. Chicago reclaimed its two-run advantage in the sixth when Frank Thomas tattooed a solo homer and Johnson tripled to center, scoring Burks and Bo Jackson. In the bottom of the inning, another RBI double from Alomar cut the lead to one, but the White Sox again restored their two-run lead in the seventh with a groundout from Joey Cora that scored Guillén and then extended it to three runs in the ninth with a single by Ventura. Roberto Hernández shut the door on the Jays in the bottom half of the inning, and the series was tied at two games apiece.

=== Game 5 ===
October 10, SkyDome

Team	1	2	3	4	5	6	7	8	9	R	H	E
Chicago	0	0	0	0	1	0	0	0	2	3	5	1
Toronto	1	1	1	1	0	0	1	0	X	5	14	0
W: Juan Guzmán (2–0) L: Jack McDowell (0–2)
HRs: CHI – Ellis Burks (1), Robin Ventura (1)

Game 5 was a rematch of Game 1, with McDowell facing Guzmán. In the first, Henderson doubled to left and then tried to steal third, but McDowell's throwing error resulted in Henderson coming home for a 1–0 Toronto lead. The Jays tacked on single runs in the second, third, and fourth, but Burks broke the shutout in the Chicago fifth with a solo home run. In the seventh, Scott Radinsky and Hernández came in to stop the bleeding for the ChiSox, but they combined to give up another run. In the ninth, Ward entered to close out the game and Ventura greeted him with a two-run shot, but he maintained his composure and struck out Jackson to give Toronto a 3–2 ALCS lead.

=== Game 6 ===
October 12, Comiskey Park

Team	1	2	3	4	5	6	7	8	9	R	H	E
Toronto	0	2	0	1	0	0	0	0	3	6	10	0
Chicago	0	0	2	0	0	0	0	0	1	3	5	3
W: Dave Stewart (2–0) L: Alex Fernandez (0–2) SV: Duane Ward (2)
HRs: TOR – Devon White (1); CHI – Warren Newson (1)

The series returned to the Windy City for Game 6, as Stewart again faced Fernandez. In the top of the second, Borders ripped a two-run single that gave the Jays the lead, but the Pale Hose tied it in the third with a bases-loaded walk by Thomas and a fielder's choice from Ventura. In the fourth, Toronto took the lead back when Molitor reached on an error by Ventura and came home on a fielder's choice by Borders. The game stayed that way until the ninth, when White homered and Molitor cracked a two-run triple to right, giving the Jays a 6–2 lead. ChiSox reserve outfielder Warren Newson tagged Ward for a solo homer in the ninth, but the Jays closer recovered and induced a flyout from Raines, sealing the game 6–3 and Toronto's second American League pennant in a row.

== World Series ==
=== Game 1 ===
October 16, 1993, at the SkyDome in Toronto, Ontario, Canada

The series' first game sent two staff aces -- Curt Schilling for Philadelphia and Juan Guzman for Toronto—against one another. The result was less than a pitcher's duel, however, as both teams scored early and often.

The deciding plays came in the middle innings. With Toronto behind 4–3 in the 5th inning, Devon White hit a solo home run to tie the game. The next inning, John Olerud hit a solo home run of his own to put Toronto on top. Toronto added three insurance runs in the bottom of the 7th and held on to win 8–5. Al Leiter pitched 2 2/3 innings—in relief of a sporadic Juan Guzman, who walked four in just five innings—for his first World Series win. John Kruk had three hits for Philadelphia.

Team	1	2	3	4	5	6	7	8	9	R	H	E
Philadelphia	2	0	1	0	1	0	0	0	1	5	11	1
Toronto	0	2	1	0	1	1	3	0	X	8	10	3
W: Al Leiter (1–0) L: Curt Schilling (0–1) S: Duane Ward (1)
HR – TOR: Devon White (1), John Olerud (1)

=== Game 2 ===
October 17, 1993, at SkyDome in Toronto, Ontario, Canada

In the second game of the series, Dave Stewart was on the mound for Toronto and Terry Mulholland started for Philadelphia. Philadelphia jumped out to an early lead: in the third inning, Jim Eisenreich followed John Kruk and Dave Hollins RBI singles with a three-run home run to deep right-centre. Toronto got on the scoreboard in the fourth inning courtesy of a Joe Carter two-run home run to left (his second most important home run of the series by a wide margin), but the Jays were unable to mount a significant offensive push later in the game. Philadelphia held on to win 6–4. Terry Mulholland pitched 5 2/3 innings, allowing 3 earned runs, for the win.

Team	1	2	3	4	5	6	7	8	9	R	H	E
Philadelphia	0	0	5	0	0	0	1	0	0	6	12	0
Toronto	0	0	0	2	0	1	0	1	0	4	8	0
W: Terry Mulholland (1–0) L: Dave Stewart (0–1) S: Mitch Williams (1)
HR: PHI – Jim Eisenreich (1), Lenny Dykstra (1) TOR – Joe Carter (1)

=== Game 3 ===
October 19, 1993, at Veterans Stadium in Philadelphia

For Toronto, Pat Hentgen faced off against Philadelphia starter Danny Jackson in Game 3. Hentgen pitched a strong 6 innings, allowing just 1 run, and the Toronto offense took care of the rest. Toronto won 10–3.

Toronto manager Cito Gaston was faced with an unusual and difficult decision prior to game time. As the series switched the National League ballpark, Gaston was forced to sit one player from his regular line-up as the designated hitter (DH) would not be allowed to play. As regular DH Paul Molitor had been a hot hand in the line-up, Gaston elected to sit firstbaseman John Olerud and place Molitor at first base. The decision was potentially controversial as Olerud led the American League in batting during the year with a .363 average and Molitor was the less sure-handed fielder. Molitor, however, put these concerns to rest, going 3 for 4, hitting a home run in the 3rd inning, and driving in 3 runs.

Team	1	2	3	4	5	6	7	8	9	R	H	E
Toronto	3	0	1	0	0	1	3	0	2	10	13	1
Philadelphia	0	0	0	0	1	0	1	0	1	3	9	0
W: Pat Hentgen (1–0) L: Danny Jackson (0–1)
HR: TOR – Paul Molitor (1) PHI – Milt Thompson (1)

=== Game 4 ===
October 20, 1993, at Veterans Stadium in Philadelphia

In the fourth game of the series, Todd Stottlemyre started for Toronto while Tommy Greene started for Philadelphia. The starters are notable because neither lasted three innings.

In one of the more unusual plays in World Series history, Todd Stottlemyre, trying to go first to third on a Roberto Alomar single in the 2nd inning, did a bellyflop diving into third base, where he was called out. Todd's awkward dive resulted in an abrasion on his chin and appeared to shake him up in the next inning, during which he surrendered a Lenny Dykstra two-run home run. Stottlemyre was pulled after the second inning, having already given up six runs. (Tommy Greene fared little better, being pulled after giving up seven runs in 2 1/3 innings.)

Philadelphia took a commanding 12–7 lead in the 5th inning, courtesy of two-run home runs from Darren Daulton and Dykstra, and a run-scoring double from Milt Thompson.

Toronto fought back from a 14–9 deficit in the 8th inning, scoring six runs on run scoring hits from Paul Molitor, Tony Fernández, Rickey Henderson, and Devon White. Duane Ward pitched the final 1 1/3 innings, preserving the 15–14 victory. Three new World Series records included the longest game at four hours fourteen minutes (4:14), most runs by both clubs with twenty-nine (29), and runs scored by a losing team with fourteen (14).

Also, Charlie Williams became the first African American to serve as the home plate umpire for a World Series game.

Team	1	2	3	4	5	6	7	8	9	R	H	E
Toronto	3	0	4	0	0	2	0	6	0	15	18	0
Philadelphia	4	2	0	1	5	1	1	0	0	14	14	0
W: Tony Castillo (1–0) L: Mitch Williams (0–1) S: Duane Ward (2)
HR: PHI – Lenny Dykstra 2 (3), Darren Daulton (1)

=== Game 5 ===
October 21, 1993, at Veterans Stadium in Philadelphia

The offenses were due for an off-day, and it came in Game 5 courtesy of a Curt Schilling (Philadelphia) and Juan Guzman (Toronto) pitching duel. Schilling shut down the previously unstoppable Toronto offense, limiting the team to just five hits and no runs. Guzman pitched well in a losing effort, allowing only two runs and five hits in seven innings of work.

The two runs scored as a result of scrappy play from the Philadelphia offense. In the first inning, Lenny Dykstra walked, stole second, moved to third on a Pat Borders throwing error, and scored on a John Kruk ground out. In the second inning, Darren Daulton opened with a double, took third on a ground out, and scored on a Kevin Stocker single.

Team	1	2	3	4	5	6	7	8	9	R	H	E
Toronto	0	0	0	0	0	0	0	0	0	0	5	1
Philadelphia	1	1	0	0	0	0	0	0	X	2	5	1
W: Curt Schilling (1–1) L: Juan Guzman (1–1)

=== Game 6 ===
October 23, 1993, at SkyDome in Toronto, Ontario, Canada

The sixth game in the series was a rematch between Game 2 starters Terry Mulholland and Dave Stewart, who would have similar results. Toronto opened up the scoring in the bottom of the first with a run-scoring Paul Molitor triple, Joe Carter sacrifice fly, and Roberto Alomar RBI single. Molitor added a solo home run in the 5th inning, bringing the score to 5–1 for Toronto.

In the 7th inning, Philadelphia fought back with five runs to take a 6–5 lead. Lenny Dykstra hit a three-run home run, Dave Hollins had an RBI single and Pete Incaviglia hit a sacrifice fly. The inning brought an end to Dave Stewart's night, leaving the game with 6 innings pitched and 4 runs given up.

Philadelphia closer Mitch Williams came on to the pitch the bottom of the 9th with Philadelphia clinging to a 6–5 lead. After beginning the inning by walking Rickey Henderson, Williams tried to counter Henderson's speed by pitching out of a slide-step style of pitching delivery. Prior to Game 6 of the 1993 World Series, Williams never used the slide-step delivery in his career. This may have cut back on the velocity of the hard throwing Williams. The walk to Henderson was followed by a Devon White fly out and a single by Paul Molitor. Joe Carter came up next and, on a two strike pitch, he hit an inside pitch just over the left field fence for a three-run walk-off home run, giving the Blue Jays a come-from-behind 8–6 victory, and the World Series crown. This was the last major North American professional sports championship won by a Canadian-based team until 2019, when the Toronto Raptors, a team that was formed in 1995, defeated the two-time defending champion Golden State Warriors in a six-game NBA Finals.

Team	1	2	3	4	5	6	7	8	9	R	H	E
Philadelphia	0	0	0	1	0	0	5	0	0	6	7	0
Toronto	3	0	0	1	1	0	0	0	3	8	10	2
W: Duane Ward (1–0) L: Mitch Williams (0–2)
HR: PHI – Lenny Dykstra (4) TOR – Paul Molitor (2), Joe Carter (2)

=== Postseason Game Log ===
Legend
Blue Jays win	Blue Jays loss	Game postponed

1993 Playoff Game Log
American League Championship Series: 4–2

#	Date	Opponent	Score	Win	Loss	Save	Stadium	Attendance	Series	Report
1	October 5	@ White Sox	7–3	Guzman (1–0)	McDowell (0–1)	–	Comiskey Park	46,246	1–0	W1
2	October 6	@ White Sox	3–1	Stewart (1–0)	Fernandez (0–1)	Ward (1)	Comiskey Park	46,101	2–0	W2
3	October 8	White Sox	1–6	Álvarez (1–0)	Hentgen (0–1)	–	SkyDome	51,783	2–1	L1
4	October 9	White Sox	4–7	Belcher (1–0)	Stottlemyre (0–1)	Hernández (1)	SkyDome	51,889	2–2	L2
5	October 10	White Sox	5–3	Guzman (2–0)	McDowell (0–2)	–	SkyDome	51,375	3–2	W1
6	October 12	@ White Sox	6–3	Stewart (2–0)	Fernandez (0–2)	Ward (2)	Comiskey Park	45,527	4–2	W2

World Series: 4–2

#	Date	Opponent	Score	Win	Loss	Save	Stadium	Attendance	Series	Report
1	October 16	Phillies	8–5	Leiter (1–0)	Schilling (0–1)	Ward (1)	SkyDome	52,011	1–0	W1
2	October 17	Phillies	4–6	Mulholland (1–0)	Stewart (0–1)	Williams (1)	SkyDome	52,062	1–1	L1
3	October 19	@ Phillies	10–3	Hentgen (1–0)	Jackson (0–1)	–	Veterans Stadium	62,689	2–1	W1
4	October 20	@ Phillies	15–14	Castillo (1–0)	Williams (0–1)	Ward (2)	Veterans Stadium	62,731	3–1	W2
5	October 21	@ Phillies	0–2	Schilling (1–1)	Guzman (0–1)	–	Veterans Stadium	62,706	3–2	L1
6	October 23	Phillies	8–6	Ward (1–0)	Williams (0–2)	–	SkyDome	52,195	4–2	W1

== Awards and honours ==
=== Awards ===
Regular Season
Player	Award	Awarded
Roberto Alomar	Gold Glove Award	November 1993
Paul Molitor	Babe Ruth Award	November 1993
Paul Molitor	Player of the Month Award	May 1993
Paul Molitor	Silver Slugger Award	November 1993
John Olerud	AL Player of the Week	May 31–June 6, 1993
John Olerud	AL Player of the Month	April 1993
John Olerud	AL Player of the Month	June 1993
John Olerud	AL Batting Champion, .363 Batting average	October 1993
John Olerud	Hutch Award	November 1993
Devon White	Gold Glove Award	November 1993

- Paul Molitor would finish as the runner-up in the American League MVP voting, while John Olerud finished third. Frank Thomas won the MVP Award, having led the Chicago White Sox to the American League West division title, before they were defeated by the Blue Jays in the ALCS.

Playoffs
Player	Award	Awarded
Dave Stewart	ALCS MVP	October 1993
Paul Molitor	World Series MVP	October 1993

- The 1993 Toronto Blue Jays received the 1994 Outstanding Team ESPY Award.
- The 1993 Toronto Blue Jays were inducted into the Ontario Sports Hall of Fame in 2002.

== 64th MLB All-Star Game ==
Infielders

Pos	#	Player	League	AB	H	RBI
2B	12	Roberto Alomar	American League; Starter	3	1	1
1B	9	John Olerud	American League; Starter	2	0	0

Outfielders

Pos	#	Player	League	AB	H	RBI
RF	29	Joe Carter	American League; Starter	3	1	0
OF	25	Devon White	American League	2	1	1

Designated Hitter

#	Player	League	AB	H	RBI
19	Paul Molitor	American League; Starter	1	0	0

Pitchers

#	Player	League	IP	SO
41	Pat Hentgen	American League	did not pitch	
31	Duane Ward	American League	1	2

Manager

#	Manager	League	Position
43	Cito Gaston	American League	Manager

Coach

#	Coach	League	Position
42	Galen Cisco	American League	Pitching
8	John Sullivan	American League	Bullpen
18	Gene Tenace	American League	Bench

== Farm system ==
Level	Team	League	Manager
AAA	Syracuse Chiefs	International League	Nick Leyva and Bob Didier
AA	Knoxville Smokies	Southern League	Garth Iorg
A	Dunedin Blue Jays	Florida State League	Dennis Holmberg
A	Hagerstown Suns	South Atlantic League	Jim Nettles
A-Short Season	St. Catharines Blue Jays	New York–Penn League	J. J. Cannon
Rookie	GCL Blue Jays	Gulf Coast League	Héctor Torres
Rookie	Medicine Hat Blue Jays	Pioneer League	Omar Malavé
