= 1993 Chicago White Sox season =

1993 Chicago White Sox
- American League West champions
- League: American League
- Division: American League West
- Ballpark: Comiskey Park
- City: Chicago
- Record: 94–68 (.580)
- Divisional place: 1st
- Owners: Jerry Reinsdorf
- General manager: Ron Schueler
- Managers: Gene Lamont
- Television: WGN-TV 9 SportsChannel Chicago (Ken Harrelson, Tom Paciorek)
- Radio: WMAQ–AM 670 (John Rooney, Ed Farmer); WIND–AM 560 (Hector Molina, Chico Carrasquel)

The 1993 Chicago White Sox season was the White Sox' 94th season. They finished with a record of 94–68, good enough for first place in the American League West, which they won on September 27, eight games ahead of the second-place Texas Rangers. However, they lost the American League Championship Series in six games to the eventual World Series champion Toronto Blue Jays. It would be the last year the Sox would compete in the American League West, as they would join the newly formed American League Central in 1994.

== Offseason ==
- December 8, 1992: Dave Stieb was signed as a free agent with the Chicago White Sox.
- January 4, 1993: Ellis Burks was signed as a free agent.

== Regular season ==
=== 1993 Opening Day lineup ===
- Tim Raines, LF
- Joey Cora, 2B
- Frank Thomas, 1B
- George Bell, DH
- Robin Ventura, 3B
- Ellis Burks, RF
- Lance Johnson, CF
- Ron Karkovice, C
- Ozzie Guillén, SS
- Jack McDowell, P

=== Season standings ===
AL West
Team	W	L	Pct.	GB	Home	Road
Chicago White Sox	94	68	.580	—	45‍–‍36	49‍–‍32
Texas Rangers	86	76	.531	8	50‍–‍31	36‍–‍45
Kansas City Royals	84	78	.519	10	43‍–‍38	41‍–‍40
Seattle Mariners	82	80	.506	12	46‍–‍35	36‍–‍45
California Angels	71	91	.438	23	44‍–‍37	27‍–‍54
Minnesota Twins	71	91	.438	23	36‍–‍45	35‍–‍46
Oakland Athletics	68	94	.420	26	38‍–‍43	30‍–‍51

=== Record vs. opponents ===
1993 American League record Source: MLB Standings Grid – 1993
Team	BAL	BOS	CAL	CWS	CLE	DET	KC	MIL	MIN	NYY	OAK	SEA	TEX	TOR
Baltimore	—	6–7	7–5	4–8	8–5	5–8	7–5	8–5	8–4	6–7	10–2	7–5	4–8	5–8
Boston	7–6	—	7–5	7–5	5–8	6–7	5–7	5–8	7–5	6–7	9–3	7–5	6–6	3–10
California	5–7	5–7	—	7–6	5–7	4–8	6–7	7–5	4–9	6–6	6–7	6–7	6–7	4–8
Chicago	8–4	5–7	6–7	—	9–3	7–5	6–7	9–3	10–3	4–8	7–6	9–4	8–5	6–6
Cleveland	5–8	8–5	7–5	3–9	—	6–7	7–5	8–5	4–8	6–7	8–4	3–9	7–5	4–9
Detroit	8–5	7–6	8–4	5–7	7–6	—	5–7	8–5	6–6	4–9	8–4	7–5	6–6	6–7
Kansas City	5–7	7–5	7–6	7–6	5–7	7–5	—	5–7	7–6	6–6	6–7	7–6	7–6	8–4
Milwaukee	5–8	8–5	5–7	3–9	5–8	5–8	7–5	—	7–5	4–9	7–5	4–8	4–8	5–8
Minnesota	4–8	5–7	9–4	3–10	8–4	6–6	6–7	5–7	—	4–8	8–5	4–9	7–6	2–10
New York	7–6	7–6	6–6	8–4	7–6	9–4	6–6	9–4	8–4	—	6–6	7–5	3–9	5–8
Oakland	2–10	3–9	7–6	6–7	4–8	4–8	7–6	5–7	5–8	6–6	—	9–4	5–8	5–7
Seattle	5–7	5–7	7–6	4–9	9–3	5–7	6–7	8–4	9–4	5–7	4–9	—	8–5	7–5
Texas	8–4	6–6	7–6	5–8	5–7	6–6	6–7	8–4	6–7	9–3	8–5	5–8	—	7–5
Toronto	8–5	10–3	8–4	6–6	9–4	7–6	4–8	8–5	10–2	8–5	7–5	5–7	5–7	—

=== Transactions ===
- April 23, 1993: Mike LaValliere was signed as a free agent with the Chicago White Sox.
- May 23, 1993: Dave Stieb was released by the Chicago White Sox.
- June 28, 1993: Carlton Fisk was released by the Chicago White Sox.
- July 31, 1993: Tim Belcher was traded by the Cincinnati Reds to the Chicago White Sox for Johnny Ruffin and Jeff Pierce.
- August 10, 1993: Bobby Thigpen was traded by the Chicago White Sox to the Philadelphia Phillies for José DeLeón.
- September 1, 1993: Donn Pall was traded by the Chicago White Sox to the Philadelphia Phillies for Doug Lindsey.

=== Roster ===
1993 Chicago White Sox
Roster
Pitchers: 40 Wilson Álvarez; 36 Tim Belcher; 51 Jason Bere; 42 Rodney Bolton; 46 Chuck Cary; 48 José DeLeón; 50 Brian Drahman; 32 Alex Fernandez; 39 Roberto Hernández; 58 Chris Howard; 50 Barry Jones; 34 Terry Leach; 25 Kirk McCaskill; 29 Jack McDowell; 22 Donn Pall; 31 Scott Radinsky; 45 Scott Ruffcorn; 49 Jeff Schwarz; 10 Dave Stieb; 37 Bobby Thigpen	Catchers: 72 Carlton Fisk; 20 Ron Karkovice; 10 Mike LaValliere; 68 Doug Lindsey; 27 Rick Wrona; Infielders: 28 Joey Cora; 62 Drew Denson; 14 Craig Grebeck; 13 Ozzie Guillén; 53 Norberto Martin; 35 Frank Thomas; 23 Robin Ventura	Outfielders: 21 George Bell; 26 Ellis Burks; 12 Mike Huff; 8 Bo Jackson; 1 Lance Johnson; 24 Warren Newson; 44 Dan Pasqua; 30 Tim Raines; 7 Steve Sax; Other Batters: 27 Iván Calderón; 5 Matt Merullo	Manager: 33 Gene Lamont; Coaches: 18 Terry Bevington (first base); 36 Jackie Brown (pitching); 6 Walt Hriniak (hitting); 17 Doug Mansolino (third base); 15 Joe Nossek (bench); 38 Dewey Robinson (bullpen)

== Game log ==
=== Regular season ===
Legend
	White Sox win
	White Sox loss
	Postponement
	Clinched division
**Bold**	White Sox team member

1993 regular season game log: 94–68 (Home: 45–36; Away: 49–32)
April: 13–9 (Home: 7–3; Away: 6–6)

#	Date	Time (CT)	Opponent	Score	Win	Loss	Save	Time of Game	Attendance	Record	Box/ Streak
15	April 23	6:38 p.m. CDT	@ Blue Jays	**W** 5–4	**McCaskill** (1–3)	Leiter (1–2)	**Hernández** (3)	2:38	50,494	8–7	W3
16	April 24	12:35 p.m. CDT	@ Blue Jays	L 4–10	Guzmán (2–0)	**Bolton** (0–3)	—	2:58	50,518	8–8	L1
17	April 25	2:04 p.m. CDT	@ Blue Jays	L 0–1	Stottelmyre (3–1)	**Fernandez** (2–2)	Ward (6)	2:13	50,430	8–9	L2
22	April 30	7:07 p.m. CDT	Blue Jays	**W** 10–2	**Fernandez** (3–2)	Stottelmyre (3–2)	—	2:40	29,497	13–9	W5

May: 11–14 (Home: 6–8; Away: 5–6)

#	Date	Time (CT)	Opponent	Score	Win	Loss	Save	Time of Game	Attendance	Record	Box/ Streak
23	May 1	6:05 p.m. CDT	Blue Jays	**W** 8–2	**Álvarez** (2–0)	Morris (1–4)	—	2:49	35,378	14–9	W6
24	May 2	1:37 p.m. CDT	Blue Jays	L 1–6	Hentgen (4–1)	**McDowell** (5–1)	Cox (1)	2:30	25,715	14–10	L1

June: 15–13 (Home: 8–4; Away: 7–9)

#	Date	Time (CT)	Opponent	Score	Win	Loss	Save	Time of Game	Attendance	Record	Box/ Streak

July: 18–9 (Home: 8–6; Away: 10–3)

#	Date	Time (CT)	Opponent	Score	Win	Loss	Save	Time of Game	Attendance	Record	Box/ Streak
80	July 5	6:37 p.m. CDT	@ Blue Jays	**W** 4–3	**Álvarez** (8–4)	Hentgen (11–3)	**Hernández** (16)	2:53	50,508	42–38	W2
81	July 6	6:35 p.m. CDT	@ Blue Jays	L 1–5	Stewart (4–3)	**McDowell** (12–6)	—	2:47	50,505	42–39	L1
82	July 7	6:36 p.m. CDT	@ Blue Jays	**W** 5–2	**Fernandez** (10–4)	Guzmán (7–2)	**Hernández** (17)	3:03	50,517	43–39	W1
—	July 13	7:40 p.m. CDT	**64th All-Star Game in Baltimore, MD**								
91	July 19	7:06 p.m. CDT	Blue Jays	L 7–15	Stewart (5–4)	**Bolton** (1–6)	—	2:58	40,127	49–42	L1
92	July 20	7:07 p.m. CDT	Blue Jays	**W** 2–1	**Fernandez** (12–4)	Guzmán (7–3)	—	2:11	30,454	50–42	W1
93	July 21	7:37 p.m. CDT	Blue Jays	L 1–4	Leiter (6–5)	**Álvarez** (8–6)	Ward (23)	3:08	30,900	50–43	L1

August: 17–12 (Home: 10–8; Away: 7–4)

#	Date	Time (CT)	Opponent	Score	Win	Loss	Save	Time of Game	Attendance	Record	Box/ Streak

September: 17–11 (Home: 6–7; Away: 11–4)

#	Date	Time (CT)	Opponent	Score	Win	Loss	Save	Time of Game	Attendance	Record	Box/ Streak

October: 3–0 (Home: 0–0; Away: 3–0)

#	Date	Time (CT)	Opponent	Score	Win	Loss	Save	Time of Game	Attendance	Record	Box/ Streak

=== Detailed records ===
American League
Opponent	W	L	WP	RS	RA
AL East
Baltimore Orioles
Boston Red Sox
Cleveland Indians
Detroit Tigers
Milwaukee Brewers
New York Yankees	4	8	0.333	48	73
Toronto Blue Jays	6	6	0.500	48	55
Div Total	10	14	0.417	96	128
AL West
California Angels
**Chicago White Sox**					
Kansas City Royals
Minnesota Twins
Oakland Athletics
Seattle Mariners
Texas Rangers	8	5	0.615	74	63
Div Total	8	5	0.615	74	63
Season Total	18	19	0.486	170	191

Month	Games	Won	Lost	Win %	RS	RA
April	7	3	4	0.429	31	44
May	8	3	5	0.375	37	40
June	3	3	0	1.000	17	12
July	6	6	6	0.500	20	30
August	8	3	5	0.375	47	45
September	5	3	2	0.600	18	20
October
Total	37	18	19	0.486	170	191

	Games	Won	Lost	Win %	RS	RA
Home	18	10	8	0.556	84	94
Away	19	8	11	0.421	86	97
Total	37	18	19	0.486	170	191

=== Postseason Game log ===
Legend
	White Sox win
	White Sox loss
**Bold**	White Sox team member

1993 Postseason game log: 2–4 (Home: 0–3; Away: 2–1)
AL Championship Series vs. Toronto Blue Jays 2–4 (Home: 0–3; Away: 2–1)

#	Date	Time (CT)	Opponent	Score	Win	Loss	Save	Time of Game	Attendance	Series	Box/ Streak
1	October 5	7:12 p.m. CDT	Blue Jays	L 3–7	Guzmán (1–0)	**McDowell** (0–1)	—	3:38	46,246	TOR 1–0	L1
2	October 6	2:07 p.m. CDT	Blue Jays	L 1–3	Stewart (1–0)	**Fernandez** (0–1)	Ward (1)	3:00	46,101	TOR 2–0	L2
3	October 8	7:12 p.m. CDT	@ Blue Jays	**W** 6–1	**Álvarez** (1–0)	Hentgen (0–1)	—	2:56	51,783	TOR 2–1	W1
4	October 9	7:12 p.m. CDT	@ Blue Jays	**W** 7–4	**Belcher** (1–0)	Stottelmyre (0–1)	**Hernández** (1)	3:30	51,885	Tied 2–2	W2
5	October 10	3:10 p.m. CDT	@ Blue Jays	L 3–5	Guzmán (2–0)	**McDowell** (0–2)	—	3:09	51,375	TOR 3–2	L1
6	October 12	7:12 p.m. CDT	Blue Jays	L 3–6	Stewart (2–0)	**Fernandez** (0–2)	Ward (2)	3:31	45,527	TOR 4–2	L2

== Player stats ==
= Indicates team leader

= Indicates league leader

=== Batting ===
Note: G = Games played; AB = At bats; R = Runs scored; H = Hits; 2B = Doubles; 3B = Triples; HR = Home runs; RBI = Runs batted in; BB = Base on balls; SO = Strikeouts; AVG = Batting average; SB = Stolen bases

Player	G	AB	R	H	2B	3B	HR	RBI	BB	SO	AVG	SB
George Bell, DH	102	410	36	89	17	2	13	64	13	49	.217	1
Ellis Burks, RF, CF	146	499	75	137	24	4	17	74	60	97	.275	6
Iván Calderón, DH	9	26	1	3	2	0	0	3	0	5	.115	0
Joey Cora, 2B	153	579	95	155	15	13	2	51	67	63	.268	20
Drew Denson, 1B	4	5	0	1	0	0	0	0	0	2	.200	0
Carlton Fisk, C	25	53	2	10	0	0	1	4	2	11	.189	0
Craig Grebeck, SS, 2B, 3B	72	190	25	43	5	0	1	12	26	26	.226	1
Ozzie Guillén, SS	134	457	44	128	23	4	4	50	10	41	.280	5
Mike Huff, OF	43	44	4	8	2	0	1	6	9	15	.182	1
Bo Jackson, OF, DH	85	284	32	66	9	0	16	45	23	106	.232	0
Lance Johnson, CF	147	540	75	168	18	14	0	47	36	33	.311	35
Ron Karkovice, C	128	403	60	92	17	1	20	54	29	126	.228	2
Mike LaValliere, C	37	97	6	25	2	0	0	8	4	14	.258	0
Doug Lindsey, C	2	1	0	0	0	0	0	0	0	0	.000	0
Norberto Martin, 2B	8	14	3	5	0	0	0	2	1	1	.357	0
Matt Merullo, DH	8	20	1	1	0	0	0	0	0	1	.050	0
Warren Newson, DH, OF	26	40	9	12	0	0	2	6	9	12	.300	0
Dan Pasqua, OF, 1B, DH	78	176	22	36	10	1	5	20	26	51	.205	2
Tim Raines, LF	115	415	75	127	16	4	16	54	64	35	.306	21
Steve Sax, OF, DH	57	119	20	28	5	0	1	8	8	6	.235	7
Frank Thomas, 1B, DH	153	549	106	174	36	0	41	128	112	54	.317	4
Robin Ventura, 3B, 1B	157	554	85	145	27	1	22	94	105	82	.262	1
Rick Wrona, C	4	8	0	1	0	0	0	1	0	4	.125	0
Team totals	162	5483	776	1454	228	44	162	731	604	834	.265	106

=== Pitching ===
Note: W = Wins; L = Losses; ERA = Earned run average; G = Games pitched; GS = Games started; SV = Saves; IP = Innings pitched; H = Hits allowed; R = Runs allowed; ER = Earned runs allowed; HR = Home runs allowed; BB = Walks allowed; K = Strikeouts

= Indicates league leader

Player	W	L	ERA	G	GS	SV	IP	H	R	ER	HR	BB	K
Wilson Álvarez	15	8	2.95	31	31	0	207.2	168	78	68	14	130	155
Tim Belcher	3	5	4.40	12	11	0	71.2	64	36	35	8	27	34
Jason Bere	12	5	3.47	24	24	0	142.2	109	60	55	12	81	129
Rod Bolton	2	6	7.44	9	8	0	42.1	55	40	35	4	16	17
Chuck Cary	1	0	5.23	16	0	0	20.2	22	12	12	1	11	10
José DeLeón	0	0	1.74	11	0	0	10.1	5	2	2	2	3	6
Brian Drahman	0	0	0.00	5	0	1	5.1	7	0	0	0	2	3
Alex Fernandez	18	9	3.13	34	34	0	247.1	221	95	86	27	72	169
Roberto Hernández	3	4	2.29	70	0	38	78.2	66	21	20	6	21	71
Chris Howard	1	0	0.00	3	0	0	2.1	2	0	0	0	4	1
Barry Jones	0	1	8.59	6	0	0	7.1	14	8	7	2	3	7
Terry Leach	0	0	2.81	14	0	1	16.0	15	5	5	0	3	3
Kirk McCaskill	4	8	5.23	30	14	2	113.2	144	71	66	12	42	65
Jack McDowell	22	10	3.37	34	34	0	256.2	261	104	96	20	75	158
Donn Pall	2	3	3.22	39	0	1	58.2	62	25	21	5	14	29
Scott Radinsky	8	2	4.28	73	0	4	54.2	61	33	26	3	22	44
Scott Ruffcorn	0	2	8.10	3	2	0	10.0	9	11	9	2	10	2
Jeff Schwarz	2	2	3.71	41	0	0	51.0	35	21	21	1	40	41
Dave Stieb	1	3	6.04	4	4	0	22.1	27	17	15	1	14	11
Bobby Thigpen	0	0	5.71	25	0	1	34.2	51	25	22	5	12	19
Team totals	94	68	3.70	162	162	48	1454.0	1398	664	598	125	302	974

== Postseason ==
=== ALCS ===
Game	Date	Visitor	Score	Home	Score	Record (TOR-CHW)	Attendance	Location
1	October 5	Toronto	7	Chicago	3	1-0	46,246	Comiskey Park II
2	October 6	Toronto	3	Chicago	1	2-0	46,101	Comiskey Park II
3	October 8	Chicago	6	Toronto	1	2-1	51,783	SkyDome
4	October 9	Chicago	7	Toronto	4	2-2	51,889	SkyDome
5	October 10	Chicago	3	Toronto	5	3-2	51,375	SkyDome
6	October 12	Toronto	6	Chicago	3	4-2	45,527	Comiskey Park II
TOR won 4, CHW won 2. Blue Jays win the American League Championship and advance to the 1993 World Series

== Awards and honors ==
- Bo Jackson, 1993 AL Comeback Player of the Year
- Bo Jackson, 1993 Tony Conigliaro Award
- Jack McDowell, All-Star Game, reserve
- Jack McDowell, Cy Young Award, American League
- Frank Thomas, All-Star Game, reserve
- Frank Thomas, Silver Slugger Award
- Frank Thomas, MVP, American League
- Gene Lamont, Manager of the Year, American League

== Farm system ==
Level	Team	League	Manager
AAA	Nashville Sounds	American Association	Rick Renick
AA	Birmingham Barons	Southern League	Terry Francona
A	Sarasota White Sox	Florida State League	Dave Huppert
A	South Bend White Sox	Midwest League	Tony Franklin
A	Hickory Crawdads	South Atlantic League	Fred Kendall
Rookie	GCL White Sox	Gulf Coast League	Mike Rojas

LEAGUE CHAMPIONS: Birmingham, South Bend
