= 1993 Cleveland Indians season =

1993 Cleveland Indians
- League: American League
- Division: East
- Ballpark: Cleveland Municipal Stadium
- City: Cleveland, Ohio
- Record: 76–86 (.469)
- Divisional place: 6th
- Owners: Richard Jacobs
- General managers: John Hart
- Managers: Mike Hargrove
- Television: WUAB; Jack Corrigan, Mike Hegan; SportsChannel; John Sanders, Rick Manning
- Radio: WKNR (1220 AM); Herb Score, Tom Hamilton

The 1993 Cleveland Indians season was the 93rd season for the franchise and their final season playing at Cleveland Stadium (which the team had played in since 1932 before moving there full-time in 1947) before moving to Jacobs Field.

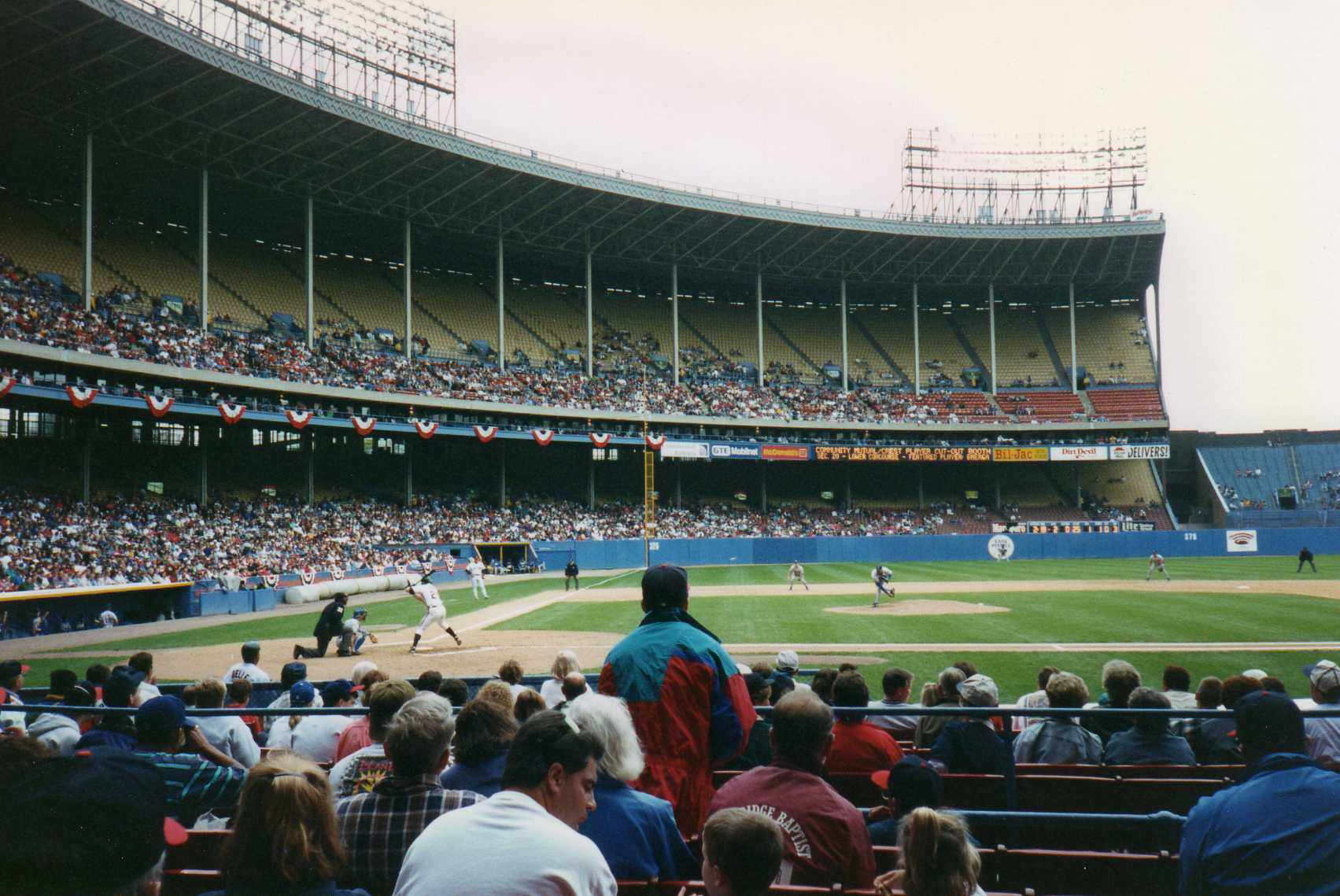
The Indians playing host to the Milwaukee Brewers at Cleveland Municipal Stadium during a 1993 home game.

== Offseason ==
- October 15, 1992: Scott Bailes was released by the California Angels.
- November 12, 1992: Eric Plunk was signed as a free agent by the Indians.
- December 7, 1992: Dave Otto was drafted from the Indians by the Pittsburgh Pirates in the 1992 minor league draft.
- December 7, 1992: Willie Cañate was drafted from the Indians by the Cincinnati Reds in the 1992 rule 5 draft.
- December 8, 1992: Bob Ojeda signed as a free agent by the Indians.
- December 14, 1992: Mike Bielecki was signed as a free agent by the Indians.
- March 4, 1993: Sam Horn was signed as a free agent by the Indians.

=== Spring training ===
The Indians were in Winter Haven for spring training on March 22, 1993, when Ojeda went on a boat ride with new teammates Steve Olin and Tim Crews. Crews was legally drunk and it was nearly dark when the boat struck a pier, killing Crews and Olin. It was the first death of active major league players since Thurman Munson in 1979. Ojeda suffered major head lacerations and sat out most of the season to recuperate – both physically and mentally. He attributed his slouch (in his seat) for saving his life. He returned late that season and had a respectable 4.40 ERA in 43 innings. In response to the accident that took Olin and Crews in 1993, the Indians wore a patch on their sleeves of their jerseys. It consisted of a baseball with their numbers on it. Olin's #31 is on the left, with an arrow above. Crews' #52 is on the right, with a star above it.

== Regular season ==
=== Season standings ===
AL East
Team	W	L	Pct.	GB	Home	Road
Toronto Blue Jays	95	67	.586	—	48‍–‍33	47‍–‍34
New York Yankees	88	74	.543	7	50‍–‍31	38‍–‍43
Baltimore Orioles	85	77	.525	10	48‍–‍33	37‍–‍44
Detroit Tigers	85	77	.525	10	44‍–‍37	41‍–‍40
Boston Red Sox	80	82	.494	15	43‍–‍38	37‍–‍44
Cleveland Indians	76	86	.469	19	46‍–‍35	30‍–‍51
Milwaukee Brewers	69	93	.426	26	38‍–‍43	31‍–‍50

=== Record vs. opponents ===
1993 American League record Source: MLB Standings Grid – 1993
Team	BAL	BOS	CAL	CWS	CLE	DET	KC	MIL	MIN	NYY	OAK	SEA	TEX	TOR
Baltimore	—	6–7	7–5	4–8	8–5	5–8	7–5	8–5	8–4	6–7	10–2	7–5	4–8	5–8
Boston	7–6	—	7–5	7–5	5–8	6–7	5–7	5–8	7–5	6–7	9–3	7–5	6–6	3–10
California	5–7	5–7	—	7–6	5–7	4–8	6–7	7–5	4–9	6–6	6–7	6–7	6–7	4–8
Chicago	8–4	5–7	6–7	—	9–3	7–5	6–7	9–3	10–3	4–8	7–6	9–4	8–5	6–6
Cleveland	5–8	8–5	7–5	3–9	—	6–7	7–5	8–5	4–8	6–7	8–4	3–9	7–5	4–9
Detroit	8–5	7–6	8–4	5–7	7–6	—	5–7	8–5	6–6	4–9	8–4	7–5	6–6	6–7
Kansas City	5–7	7–5	7–6	7–6	5–7	7–5	—	5–7	7–6	6–6	6–7	7–6	7–6	8–4
Milwaukee	5–8	8–5	5–7	3–9	5–8	5–8	7–5	—	7–5	4–9	7–5	4–8	4–8	5–8
Minnesota	4–8	5–7	9–4	3–10	8–4	6–6	6–7	5–7	—	4–8	8–5	4–9	7–6	2–10
New York	7–6	7–6	6–6	8–4	7–6	9–4	6–6	9–4	8–4	—	6–6	7–5	3–9	5–8
Oakland	2–10	3–9	7–6	6–7	4–8	4–8	7–6	5–7	5–8	6–6	—	9–4	5–8	5–7
Seattle	5–7	5–7	7–6	4–9	9–3	5–7	6–7	8–4	9–4	5–7	4–9	—	8–5	7–5
Texas	8–4	6–6	7–6	5–8	5–7	6–6	6–7	8–4	6–7	9–3	8–5	5–8	—	7–5
Toronto	8–5	10–3	8–4	6–6	9–4	7–6	4–8	8–5	10–2	8–5	7–5	5–7	5–7	—

=== Notable transactions ===
- March 24, 1993: Mike Aldrete was released by the Indians.
- March 31, 1993: Mark Whiten was traded by the Indians to the St. Louis Cardinals for Mark Clark and Juan Andújar (minors).
- June 1, 1993: José Hernández was traded by the Indians to the Chicago Cubs for Heathcliff Slocumb.
- June 1, 1993: Fernando Hernández and Tracy Sanders (minors) were traded by the Indians to the San Diego Padres for Jeremy Hernández.
- June 19, 1993: Mike Bielecki was released by the Indians.
- August 17, 1993: Thomas Howard was traded by the Indians to the Cincinnati Reds for Randy Milligan.
- August 19, 1993: Glenallen Hill was traded by the Indians to the Chicago Cubs for Candy Maldonado.

=== Opening Day Lineup ===
Opening Day Starters
#	Name	Position
7	Kenny Lofton	CF
16	Félix Fermín	SS
9	Carlos Baerga	2B
8	Albert Belle	LF
11	Paul Sorrento	1B
44	Reggie Jefferson	DH
42	Carlos Martínez	3B
22	Glenallen Hill	RF
15	Sandy Alomar Jr.	C
41	Charles Nagy	P

=== Roster ===
1993 Cleveland Indians
Roster
Pitchers: 58 Paul Abbott; 36 Mike Bielecki; 32 Mike Christopher; 54 Mark Clark; 39 Dennis Cook; 45 Jerry DiPoto; 48 Jason Grimsley; 53 Jeremy Hernandez; 29 Tom Kramer; 28 Derek Lilliquist; 59 Albie Lopez; 49 José Mesa; 49 Bob Milacki; 23 Dave Mlicki; 50,36 Jeff Mutis; 41 Charles Nagy; 17 Bob Ojeda; 38 Eric Plunk; 48 Ted Power; 47 Scott Scudder; 51 Heathcliff Slocumb; 50 Julián Tavárez; 46 Bill Wertz; 53 Kevin Wickander; 43 Cliff Young; 40 Matt Young	Catchers: 15 Sandy Alomar Jr.; 12 Jesse Levis; 0 Junior Ortiz; 13 Lance Parrish; Infielders: 9 Carlos Baerga; 10 Álvaro Espinoza; 16 Félix Fermín; 44 Reggie Jefferson; 20 Mark Lewis; 42 Carlos Martínez; 40 Randy Milligan; 11 Paul Sorrento; 25 Jim Thome; 27 Jeff Treadway	Outfielders: 8 Albert Belle; 22 Glenallen Hill; 33 Thomas Howard; 35 Wayne Kirby; 7 Kenny Lofton; 22 Candy Maldonado; 24 Manny Ramirez; Other batters: 1 Sam Horn	Manager: 21 Mike Hargrove; Coaches: 24 Rick Adair (pitching); 51 Ken Bolek (assistant); 30 Dom Chiti (bullpen); 6 Ron Clark (bench); 34 José Morales (hitting); 14 Dave Nelson (first base); 55 Jeff Newman (third base)

== Player stats ==
= Indicates team leader

=== Batting ===
==== Starters by position ====
Note: Pos = Position; G = Games played; AB = At bats; H = Hits; Avg. = Batting average; HR = Home runs; RBI = Runs batted in

Pos	Player	G	AB	H	Avg.	HR	RBI
C	Junior Ortiz	95	249	55	.221	0	20
1B	Paul Sorrento	148	463	119	.257	18	65
2B	Carlos Baerga	154	624	200	.321	21	114
3B	Álvaro Espinoza	129	263	73	.264	4	27
SS	Félix Fermín	140	480	126	.263	2	45
LF	Albert Belle	159	594	172	.290	38	129
CF	Kenny Lofton	148	569	185	.325	1	42
RF	Wayne Kirby	131	458	123	.269	6	60
DH	Reggie Jefferson	113	366	91	.249	10	34

==== Other batters ====
Note: G = Games played; AB = At bats; H = Hits; Avg. = Batting average; HR = Home runs; RBI = Runs batted in

Player	G	AB	H	Avg.	HR	RBI
Carlos Martínez	80	262	64	.244	5	31
Jeff Treadway	97	221	67	.303	2	27
Sandy Alomar Jr.	64	215	58	.270	6	32
Thomas Howard	74	178	42	.236	3	23
Glenallen Hill	66	174	39	.224	5	25
Jim Thome	47	154	41	.266	7	22
Candy Maldonado	28	81	20	.247	5	20
Jesse Levis	31	63	11	.175	0	4
Manny Ramirez	22	53	9	.170	2	5
Mark Lewis	14	52	13	.250	1	5
Randy Milligan	19	47	20	.426	0	7
Sam Horn	12	33	15	.455	4	8
Lance Parrish	10	20	4	.200	1	2

=== Pitching ===
==== Starting pitchers ====
Note: GS = Games started; IP = Innings pitched; W = Wins; L = Losses; ERA = Earned run average; SO = Strikeouts;

Player	GS	IP	W	L	ERA	SO
José Mesa	33	208.2	10	12	4.92	118
Mark Clark	15	109.1	7	5	4.28	57
Jeff Mutis	13	81.0	3	6	5.78	29
Mike Bielecki	13	68.2	4	5	5.02	38
Albie Lopez	9	49.2	3	1	5.98	25
Charles Nagy	9	48.2	2	6	6.29	30
Bob Ojeda	7	43.0	2	1	4.40	27
Julián Tavárez	8	37.0	2	2	6.57	19
Paul Abbott	5	18.1	0	1	6.38	7
Dave Mlicki	3	13.1	0	0	3.38	7

==== Other pitchers ====
Note: G = Games pitched; IP = Innings pitched; W = Wins; L = Losses; ERA = Earned run average; SO = Strikeouts

Player	G	IP	W	L	ERA	SO
Tom Kramer	39	121.1	7	3	4.06	71
Matt Young	22	74.1	1	6	5.21	65
Cliff Young	21	60.1	3	3	4.62	31
Dennis Cook	25	54.0	5	5	5.67	34
Jason Grimsley	10	42.1	3	4	5.31	27
Bob Milacki	5	16.0	1	1	3.38	7
Scott Scudder	2	4.0	0	1	9.00	1

==== Relief pitchers ====
Note: G = Games pitched; W = Wins; L = Losses; SV = Saves; ERA = Earned run average; SO = Strikeouts

Player	G	W	L	SV	ERA	SO
Eric Plunk	70	4	5	15	2.79	77
Derek Lilliquist	56	4	4	10	2.25	40
Jerry Dipoto	46	4	4	11	2.40	41
Jeremy Hernandez	45	6	5	8	3.14	44
Bill Wertz	34	2	3	0	3.62	53
Heathcliff Slocumb	20	3	1	0	4.28	18
Ted Power	20	0	2	0	7.20	11
Kevin Wickander	11	0	0	0	4.15	3
Mike Christopher	9	0	0	0	3.86	8

== Awards and honors ==
- Kenny Lofton, AL leader in Stolen Bases

All-Star Game

- Carlos Baerga, Reserve
- Albert Belle, Reserve

== Minor league affiliates ==
Classification level	Team	League	Manager
AAA	Charlotte Knights	International League	Charlie Manuel
AA	Canton–Akron Indians	Eastern League	Brian Graham
Advanced A	Kinston Indians	Carolina League	Dave Keller
A	Columbus RedStixx	South Atlantic League	Mike Brown
Short Season A	Watertown Indians	New York–Penn League	Mike Young
Rookie	Burlington Indians	Appalachian League	Jim Gabella
