= 1993 American League Championship Series =

25th edition of Major League Baseball's American League Championship Series

Team (Wins)	Managers	Season
Toronto Blue Jays (4)	Cito Gaston	95–67, .586, GA: 7
Chicago White Sox (2)	Gene Lamont	94–68, .580, GA: 8
- Dates: October 5–12
- MVP: Dave Stewart (Toronto)
- Umpires: Jim Evans (crew chief); Greg Kosc; John Shulock; Ted Hendry; Tim Tschida; Ken Kaiser

Broadcast
- Television: CBS, CTV
- TV announcers: Greg Gumbel and Jim Kaat
- Radio: CBS; CJCL (Toronto); WMAQ (Chicago)
- Radio announcers: CBS: Jim Hunter and Ernie Harwell; CJCL: Tom Cheek and Jerry Howarth; WMAQ: John Rooney and Ed Farmer

The 1993 American League Championship Series was a semifinal series in Major League Baseball's 1993 postseason played between the East Division champion Toronto Blue Jays and the West Division champion Chicago White Sox from October 5 to 12. The defending champion Blue Jays defeated the White Sox, 4–2, to advance to the 1993 World Series which they would win 4–2 over the Philadelphia Phillies thanks to Joe Carter's dramatic three-run walk-off home run in Game 6. The 1993 ALCS was the last played under the AL's two-division format, as the league realigned into three divisions the following year.

== Summary ==
The Blue Jays finished the 1993 regular season with a 95–67 record (.586), good enough to win them their third consecutive East division title. They clinched the division championship on September 27 in a 2–0 win against the Milwaukee Brewers in Milwaukee. The White Sox ended 1993 with a 94–68 record (.580) to claim the West division crown. They too clinched the West Division on September 27; the final score was 4–2 against the Seattle Mariners in Chicago. Both teams won their respective divisions by large margins: Toronto had a seven-game lead over the New York Yankees, and Chicago beat out the Texas Rangers by eight games.

=== Chicago White Sox vs. Toronto Blue Jays ===
Toronto won the series, 4–2.

Game	Date	Score	Location	Time	Attendance
1	October 5	Toronto Blue Jays – 7, Chicago White Sox – 3	Comiskey Park (II)	3:38	46,246
2	October 6	Toronto Blue Jays – 3, Chicago White Sox – 1	Comiskey Park (II)	3:00	46,101
3	October 8	Chicago White Sox – 6, Toronto Blue Jays – 1	SkyDome	2:56	51,783
4	October 9	Chicago White Sox – 7, Toronto Blue Jays – 4	SkyDome	3:30	51,889
5	October 10	Chicago White Sox – 3, Toronto Blue Jays – 5	SkyDome	3:09	51,375
6	October 12	Toronto Blue Jays – 6, Chicago White Sox – 3	Comiskey Park (II)	3:31	45,527

== Game summaries ==
=== Game 1 ===
October 5, 1993 7:12 pm (CT) at Comiskey Park (II) in Chicago, Illinois
Team	1	2	3	4	5	6	7	8	9	R	H	E
Toronto	0	0	0	2	3	0	2	0	0	7	17	1
Chicago	0	0	0	3	0	0	0	0	0	3	6	1
WP: Juan Guzmán (1–0) LP: Jack McDowell (0–1); Home runs: TOR: Paul Molitor (1); CWS: None

The ALCS opened at Comiskey Park with a battle of aces, as Toronto threw Juan Guzmán against Chicago's Jack McDowell, the eventual 1993 American League Cy Young Award winner. The game was scoreless until the top of the fourth inning, when Blue Jays third baseman Ed Sprague stroked a triple to right field that scored John Olerud and Paul Molitor. The White Sox took a 3–2 lead in the bottom of the fourth inning with RBI base hits by Ozzie Guillén and Tim Raines, but Toronto stormed back in its half of the fifth with a two-run double by Olerud and a run-scoring single by Molitor. The Jays' designated hitter added a two-run homer in the seventh that finally chased McDowell, and the Chicago batters could muster nothing more against Toronto's bullpen as the Blue Jays took the game 7–3 and a 1–0 lead in the series.

==== Michael Jordan ====
The game's first pitch was thrown by basketball superstar Michael Jordan, who recently had won his third consecutive NBA championship as a member of the Chicago Bulls. After he threw out the first pitch, Jordan headed to the private box of White Sox owner Jerry Reinsdorf, who also owns the Bulls. At some point during the game, Jordan told Reinsdorf that he was planning on retiring from basketball. The information somehow got leaked from the box and the gathered press corps received word. CBS’ Pat O’Brien, who was hosting the pregame festivities for the network, interrupted the network's broadcast to relay the information to the national audience watching at home while several dozen reporters converged on Reinsdorf's box looking for a confirmation. Jordan left the stadium shortly thereafter without speaking to reporters; the next morning, at a nationally televised press conference, Jordan confirmed the story.

=== Game 2 ===
October 6, 1993 2:07 pm (CT) at Comiskey Park (II) in Chicago, Illinois
Team	1	2	3	4	5	6	7	8	9	R	H	E
Toronto	1	0	0	2	0	0	0	0	0	3	8	0
Chicago	1	0	0	0	0	0	0	0	0	1	7	2
WP: Dave Stewart (1–0) LP: Alex Fernandez (0–1) Sv: Duane Ward (1)

In Game 2, the Blue Jays' Dave Stewart faced off against the Sox' Alex Fernandez. Toronto struck in the first when Rickey Henderson reached on an error by Dan Pasqua and later scored on a fielder's choice by Roberto Alomar, but the Pale Hose tied the game in the bottom of the inning when Stewart walked the bases loaded and then unleashed a wild pitch, scoring Raines. The contest remained knotted at one-all until the top of the fourth, when the Blue Jays touched Fernandez for two runs via singles by Tony Fernández and Pat Borders. As in the first game, the White Sox could not solve Toronto's relievers, and Duane Ward (who had notched a league-leading 45 saves during the regular season) secured his first playoff save as the Blue Jays took a 2–0 lead in the series with a 3–1 victory.

=== Game 3 ===
October 8, 1993 8:12 pm (ET) at SkyDome in Toronto, Ontario
Team	1	2	3	4	5	6	7	8	9	R	H	E
Chicago	0	0	5	1	0	0	0	0	0	6	12	0
Toronto	0	0	1	0	0	0	0	0	0	1	7	1
WP: Wilson Álvarez (1–0) LP: Pat Hentgen (0–1)

The series shifted north of the border for Game 3, featuring Chicago's Wilson Álvarez taking on Toronto's Pat Hentgen. The two starters traded zeroes until the South Siders erupted with a five-run third, including a pair of two-run singles by Ellis Burks and Lance Johnson. The Blue Jays got a run in the bottom half of the frame when Henderson doubled, stole third, and scored on a Devon White single, but Hentgen was pulled in the fourth after giving up back-to-back base hits. His replacement on the mound, Danny Cox, gave up another run when a Robin Ventura sacrifice fly plated Guillén. This was more than enough for Alvarez, who went the distance as the Pale Hose cut Toronto's series lead to 2–1.

=== Game 4 ===
October 9, 1993 8:12 pm (ET) at SkyDome in Toronto, Ontario
Team	1	2	3	4	5	6	7	8	9	R	H	E
Chicago	0	2	0	0	0	3	1	0	1	7	11	0
Toronto	0	0	3	0	0	1	0	0	0	4	9	0
WP: Tim Belcher (1–0) LP: Todd Stottlemyre (0–1) Sv: Roberto Hernández (1); Home runs: CWS: Lance Johnson (1), Frank Thomas (1); TOR: None

In Game 4, the Sox sent rookie Jason Bere to the hill against the Jays' Todd Stottlemyre. The South Siders took a 2–0 lead in the top of the second thanks to a home run by Johnson, but Toronto came back in the third with an RBI double from Alomar and a two-run single by Joe Carter, after which Pale Hose skipper Gene Lamont yanked Bere and replaced him with Tim Belcher. Chicago reclaimed its two-run advantage in the sixth when Frank Thomas tattooed a homer and Johnson tripled to center, scoring Burks and Bo Jackson. In the bottom of the inning, another RBI double from Alomar cut the lead to one, but the White Sox again restored their two-run lead in the seventh with a groundout from Joey Cora that scored Guillén and then extended it to three runs in the ninth with a single by Ventura. Roberto Hernández shut the door on the Blue Jays in the bottom half of the inning, and the series was tied at two games apiece, dropping the Blue Jays' all-time ALCS record at SkyDome to a dismal 3–8 record.

=== Game 5 ===
October 10, 1993 4:10 pm (ET) at SkyDome in Toronto, Ontario
Team	1	2	3	4	5	6	7	8	9	R	H	E
Chicago	0	0	0	0	1	0	0	0	2	3	5	1
Toronto	1	1	1	1	0	0	1	0	X	5	14	0
WP: Juan Guzmán (2–0) LP: Jack McDowell (0–2); Home runs: CWS: Ellis Burks (1), Robin Ventura (1); TOR: None

Game 5 was a rematch of Game 1, with McDowell facing Guzmán. In the first, Henderson doubled to left and then tried to steal third, but McDowell's throwing error resulted in Henderson coming home for a 1–0 Toronto lead. The Blue Jays tacked on single runs in the second, third, and fourth, but Burks broke the shutout in the Chicago fifth with a home run. In the seventh, Scott Radinsky and Hernández came in to stop the bleeding for the White Sox, but they combined to give up another run. In the ninth, Ward entered to close out the game and Ventura greeted him with a two-run shot, but he maintained his composure and struck out Jackson to give Toronto a 3–2 ALCS lead.

=== Game 6 ===
October 12, 1993 7:12 pm (CT) at Comiskey Park (II) in Chicago, Illinois
Team	1	2	3	4	5	6	7	8	9	R	H	E
Toronto	0	2	0	1	0	0	0	0	3	6	10	0
Chicago	0	0	2	0	0	0	0	0	1	3	5	3
WP: Dave Stewart (2–0) LP: Alex Fernandez (0–2) Sv: Duane Ward (2); Home runs: TOR: Devon White (1); CWS: Warren Newson (1)

The series returned to the Windy City for Game 6, as Stewart again faced Fernandez. In the top of the second, Borders ripped a two-run single that gave the Blue Jays the lead, but the Pale Hose tied it in the third with a bases-loaded walk by Thomas and a fielder's choice from Ventura. In the fourth, Toronto took the lead back when Molitor reached on an error by Ventura and came home on a fielder's choice by Borders. The game stayed that way until the ninth, when White homered and Molitor cracked a two-run triple to right, giving the Blue Jays a 6–2 lead. White Sox reserve outfielder Warren Newson tagged Ward for a homer in the ninth, but the Jays closer recovered and induced a flyout from Raines, sealing the game 6–3 and Toronto's second American League pennant in a row.

== Composite box ==
1993 ALCS (4–2): Toronto Blue Jays over Chicago White Sox

Team	1	2	3	4	5	6	7	8	9	R	H	E
Toronto Blue Jays	2	3	5	6	3	1	3	0	3	26	65	2
Chicago White Sox	1	2	7	4	1	3	1	0	4	23	46	7
Total attendance: 292,921 Average attendance: 48,820

== Broadcasting notes ==
Locally, the series was called on CJCL-AM in Toronto by Tom Cheek and Jerry Howarth, and WMAQ-AM in Chicago by John Rooney and Ed Farmer.
