= Jeff Montgomery (baseball) =

American baseball player (born 1962)

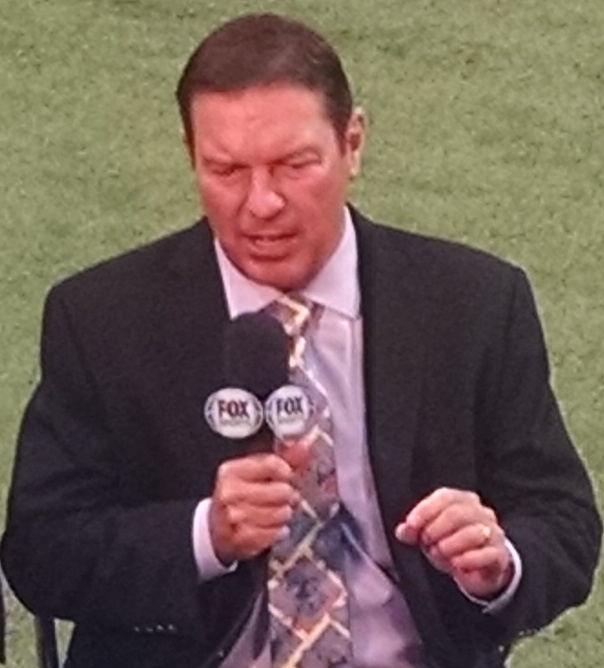
- Montgomery with Fox Sports Kansas City in 2016
- Pitcher
- Born: January 7, 1962 (age 64); Wellston, Ohio, U.S.
- Batted: Right Threw: Right

MLB debut
- August 1, 1987, for the Cincinnati Reds

Last MLB appearance
- October 2, 1999, for the Kansas City Royals

MLB statistics
- Win–loss record: 46–52
- Earned run average: 3.27
- Strikeouts: 733
- Saves: 304
- Stats at Baseball Reference

Teams
- Cincinnati Reds (1987); Kansas City Royals (1988–1999)

Career highlights and awards
- 3× All-Star (1992, 1993, 1996); AL Rolaids Relief Man Award (1993); AL saves leader (1993); Kansas City Royals Hall of Fame

Jeffrey Thomas Montgomery (born January 7, 1962) is an American former Major League Baseball relief pitcher. During a 13-year baseball career, he pitched from 1987 to 1999, primarily for the Kansas City Royals.

== Professional career ==
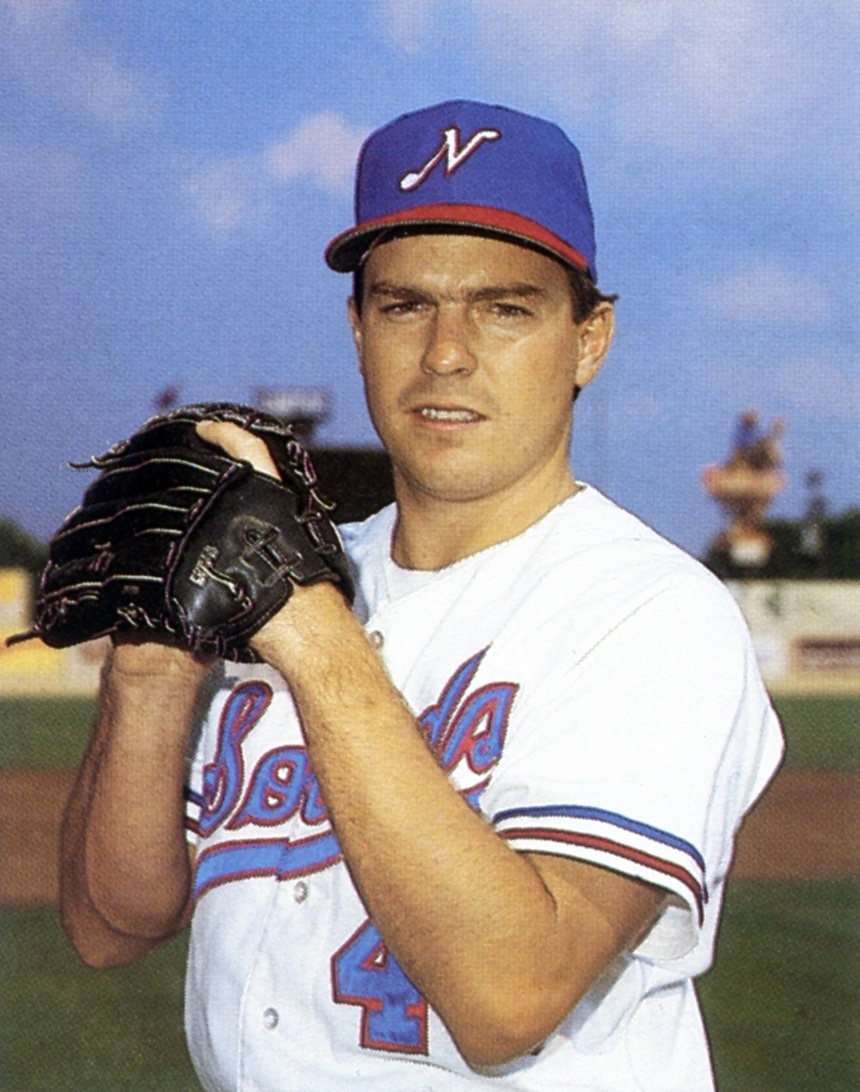
Montgomery with the Nashville Sounds in 1987

Montgomery played collegiate baseball at Marshall University. He was drafted by the Cincinnati Reds in the 9th round of the 1983 MLB draft. He made his debut with the Reds on August 1, 1987, at age 25. He pitched a total of 14 games, including one start. He was considered a marginal prospect, and the Reds traded Montgomery to the Royals on February 15, 1988, for Van Snider, an outfielder who would go on to only play 19 games in the majors.

Kansas City installed Montgomery in the bullpen, and he appeared in 45 games, posting a record of 7–2 with a 3.45 earned run average (ERA). In 1989, he had a breakout season, winning seven games and losing three with 18 saves, and posting a 1.37 ERA while acting primarily as a set-up man for Steve Farr. The following season, he became the Royals' closer, a role he held for most of his career.

On April 29, 1990, Montgomery struck out all three batters on nine total pitches in the eighth inning of a 5–2 win over the Texas Rangers; he became the ninth American League pitcher and the 23rd pitcher in major-league history to accomplish an immaculate inning.

In 1993, Montgomery saved 45 games, tying Dan Quisenberry for the Royals' team record and tying him for the league lead with Duane Ward of the Toronto Blue Jays. That year he won the American League Rolaids Relief Man Award. Montgomery was also an All-Star in 1992, 1993, and 1996.

In 1998, Montgomery collected 36 saves and was named Kansas City Royals Pitcher of the Year following the season. Montgomery lost effectiveness during the 1999 season, which he finished with 12 saves and a 6.84 ERA. He retired following the season, and was inducted into the Royals' Hall of Fame in 2003, his first year of eligibility.

== Personal ==
Following his career, Montgomery appeared in an instructional video titled The Fundamentals of Pitching with Jeff Montgomery.

Montgomery is involved in many business interests, among them serving as a Vice-President of Union Broadcasting in Overland Park, Kansas , a suburb of Kansas City. He often contributes his baseball analysis to Union Broadcasting's sports wing, 810 WHB. Jeff lives with his wife Tina and four children. He has two daughters, Ashleigh and Kathryn and two sons, Connor and Spencer.

In 2010, Montgomery was hired by Fox Sports Kansas City, where he serves as an analyst on the Royals Live pregame show and in the broadcast booth on select game telecasts.

== See also ==
- List of Major League Baseball annual saves leaders
