= Todd Stottlemyre =

American baseball player (born 1965)

- Pitcher
- Born: May 20, 1965 (age 61); Yakima, Washington, U.S.
- Batted: Left Threw: Right

MLB debut
- April 6, 1988, for the Toronto Blue Jays

Last MLB appearance
- June 26, 2002, for the Arizona Diamondbacks

MLB statistics
- Win–loss record: 138–121
- Earned run average: 4.28
- Strikeouts: 1,587
- Stats at Baseball Reference

Teams
- Toronto Blue Jays (1988–1994); Oakland Athletics (1995); St. Louis Cardinals (1996–1998); Texas Rangers (1998); Arizona Diamondbacks (1999–2000, 2002)

Career highlights and awards
- 2× World Series champion (1992, 1993)

Todd Vernon Stottlemyre (born May 20, 1965) is an American former professional baseball player. He played for 15 seasons in Major League Baseball as a starting pitcher from 1988 to 2002, most notably as a member of the Toronto Blue Jays with whom he won two World Series championships in 1992 and 1993. He also played for the Oakland Athletics, St. Louis Cardinals, Texas Rangers, and the Arizona Diamondbacks.

== Career ==
Stottlemyre was drafted by the New York Yankees in the 5th round of the 1983 amateur draft, but did not sign. He attended Yakima Valley Community College. In 1985 Stottlemyre played collegiate summer baseball with the Harwich Mariners of the Cape Cod Baseball League and was named a league all-star. He was drafted by the St. Louis Cardinals in the 1st round (1st pick) of the 1985 amateur draft (January Secondary), but he did not sign again.

The Toronto Blue Jays selected him out of UNLV as the third overall pick in the 1985 MLB draft and he signed with them on August 12, 1985. He spent seven seasons with the Blue Jays, helping them win the 1992 & 1993 World Series. His best season came in 1991, when he recorded 15 wins, pitched 219 innings with an E.R.A. of 3.78.

Stottlemyre signed with the Oakland Athletics for the 1995 season. He was traded to the Cardinals prior to the 1996 season where he put up respectable numbers for nearly three seasons. On July 31, 1998 (trade deadline day) the Cardinals traded him along with Royce Clayton to the Texas Rangers in exchange for Darren Oliver, Fernando Tatis and a player to be named later (Mark Little). Stottlemyre would sign a 4-year, $32 million contract with the Arizona Diamondbacks following the 1998 season but he struggled with injuries and could not replicate the success he previously had.

In 2000 he was awarded the Branch Rickey Award, which honored his outstanding community service.

== Scouting report ==
His fastball, average (high) velocity, clocked around 92-93 mph. Stottlemyre possessed above-average control of his pitches. His style of pitching was direct - using an inside fastball to challenge opposing hitters. Furthermore, he possessed an above-average slider, curveball, and later on, a splitter (adopted from teammate Dave Stewart). His weaknesses as a pitcher, although subject to debate, were his predictability of confronting opposing hitters, pitches over the 'heart' of home plate, hittable fastballs, and flat curveballs. Changing speeds was not a part of his repertoire; Stottlemyre did not possess an effective changeup.

== Incidents ==
While pitching for the Blue Jays in Game 4 of the 1993 World Series against the Philadelphia Phillies, Stottlemyre tried to go from first to third on a single by Roberto Alomar. His baserunning skills indicated inexperience; he hesitated between second and third base. The attempt resulted in him being thrown/tagged out while sliding head-first into third base, and scraping his chin in the process. That prompted Ed Rendell, then the Mayor of Philadelphia, to ridicule Stottlemyre, while also adding that he could hit his pitches. After Stottlemyre and his teammates won the Series, Stottlemyre responded to the comment at the ensuing victory rally, expressing his displeasure with the mayor by declaring, "You can kiss my ass!".

On February 20, 1994, Stottlemyre and Blue Jays teammate Dave Stewart were both arrested in Dunedin, Florida, for battery on a law enforcement officer and resisting arrest after an argument arose between Stewart, who was accompanied by Stottlemyre, at a night club, reportedly over Stewart's refusal to pay a $3 cover fee. Stottlemyre and Stewart were found not guilty after a seven-day jury trial.

== Post-baseball career ==
After retiring from baseball in 2002, Stottlemyre became a stock market analyst for Merrill Lynch.

As of 2010, Stottlemyre is a member of ACN Inc., operating a network within the multilevel marketing company selling telecommunications, energy, banking, and other services. He is now a Platinum Regional Vice President of the company.

Stottlemyre serves on the board of directors for several companies.

== Personal ==
Married with five children, Stottlemyre is the second son of Mel Stottlemyre (1941–2019), a former New York Yankees pitcher and longtime MLB pitching coach. Older brother Mel Jr. (b.1963) also pitched in the major leagues for the Kansas City Royals in 1990, and was most recently the pitching coach for the Miami Marlins.

== See also ==
- Arizona Diamondbacks award winners and league leaders
- List of Major League Baseball career hit batsmen leaders
- List of second-generation Major League Baseball players
- List of St. Louis Cardinals team records
- List of Toronto Blue Jays team records
- List of World Series starting pitchers
