= Tom Kramer =

American baseball player (born 1968)

- Pitcher
- Born: January 9, 1968 (age 58); Cincinnati, Ohio, U.S.
- Batted: Switch Threw: Right

MLB debut
- September 12, 1991, for the Cleveland Indians

Last MLB appearance
- September 21, 1993, for the Cleveland Indians

MLB statistics
- Win–loss record: 7–3
- Earned run average: 4.51
- Strikeouts: 75
- Stats at Baseball Reference

Teams
- Cleveland Indians (1991–1993)

Thomas Joseph Kramer (born January 9, 1968) is an American former Major League Baseball pitcher who played for the Cleveland Indians during the 1991 and 1993 seasons.

== Career with the Indians ==
Kramer was drafted by the Indians in the fifth round of the 1987 amateur draft, and signed by the team on June 10, 1987. He worked his way up from the Indians' then-Rookie League affiliate, the Burlington Indians, to their AAA affiliate, the Colorado Springs Sky Sox, over a period of four seasons from 1987 to 1991; in this time span, he amassed a record of 52 wins and 31 losses in 704.6 innings pitched.

Kramer made his major league pitching debut for the Cleveland Indians on September 12, 1991; in four games of relief pitching for the Indians, he gave up nine earned runs in 4.2 innings pitched for an earned run average of 17.36. Following the conclusion of the 1991 season, he was called back down to the Sky Sox, where he pitched a full season in 1992 and compiled a record of 8 wins and 3 losses with an earned run average of 4.86 in 76.0 innings pitched.

Kramer was called up to the Indians for the 1993 season; after mostly pitching in relief until mid-May, he won his first game as a major league pitcher on May 24, throwing a complete game one-hitter against the Texas Rangers. This would largely prove to end up being Kramer's one large success in a short major league playing career; despite finishing the season with a record of 7 wins and 3 losses and an earned run average of 4.02, he was assigned to the Charlotte Knights for the beginning of the 1994 season, compiling a record of 1 win and 3 losses with an earned run average of 4.74 in 19.0 innings pitched.

== Post-Indians and eventual retirement ==
Midway through the 1994 season, Kramer was traded to the Cincinnati Reds for fellow minor leaguer John Hrusovsky. He would pitch the rest of that season for their then-AAA affiliate, the Indianapolis Indians, where he compiled a record of five wins and four losses with a 4.47 earned run average in 102.2 innings pitched.

Despite starting the 1995 season with a record of twelve wins and one loss and a 3.33 earned run average in 127.0 innings pitched for the Reds' then-AA affiliate, the Chattanooga Lookouts, Kramer was traded to the Detroit Tigers midway through the season, finishing out the season pitching for then-AAA affiliate Toledo.

Kramer spent the next three seasons after 1995 pitching for the Colorado Rockies, spending his time exclusively with AAA-affiliated Colorado Springs; this was a return of sorts for Kramer, as he had pitched for them a few seasons earlier, albeit as an Indians affiliate. After three years of lackluster numbers, he retired from baseball as a minor leaguer at the conclusion of the 1998 season, having never made it back to the major leagues since his 1993 rookie debut for Cleveland.

== Footnotes ==
Although Kramer made his major-league pitching debut in 1991, Major League Baseball considers Kramer's rookie season to have been in 1993 because he did not pitch the minimum fifty innings in 1991 to be considered a "rookie" per their definition of the term, whereas he did in 1993.
