= 1993 Major League Baseball All-Star Game =

1993 American baseball competition

	1	2	3	4	5	6	7	8	9	R	H	E
National League	2	0	0	0	0	1	0	0	0	3	7	2
American League	0	1	1	0	3	3	0	1	X	9	11	0
- Date: July 13, 1993
- Venue: Oriole Park at Camden Yards
- City: Baltimore, Maryland
- Managers: Bobby Cox (ATL); Cito Gaston (TOR)
- MVP: Kirby Puckett (MIN)
- Attendance: 48,147
- Ceremonial first pitch: Al Kaline, Brooks Robinson and Leon Day
- Television: CBS
- TV announcers: Sean McDonough and Tim McCarver
- Radio: CBS
- Radio announcers: John Rooney, Jerry Coleman and Johnny Bench

The 1993 Major League Baseball All-Star Game was the 60th playing of the midsummer classic between the all-stars of the American League (AL) and National League (NL), the two leagues comprising Major League Baseball. The game was held on July 13, 1993, at Oriole Park at Camden Yards in Baltimore, Maryland, the home of the Baltimore Orioles of the American League. The game resulted in the American League defeating the National League 9-3.

This is also the last Major League Baseball All-Star Game to date to be televised by CBS and to be held in Baltimore. After a foul ball off a line drive by Tom Glavine in the 3rd inning, during the broadcast coverage, CBS announced the death of NASCAR driver Davey Allison

== Rosters ==
Players in italics have since been inducted into the National Baseball Hall of Fame.

=== National League ===
Starters
Position	Player	Team	All-Star Games
P	Terry Mulholland	Phillies	1
C	Darren Daulton	Phillies	2
1B	John Kruk	Phillies	3
2B	Ryne Sandberg	Cubs	10
3B	Gary Sheffield	Marlins	2
SS	Barry Larkin	Reds	5
OF	Barry Bonds	Giants	3
OF	Marquis Grissom	Expos	1
OF	David Justice	Braves	1
DH	Mark Grace	Cubs	1

Pitchers
Position	Player	Team	All-Star Games
P	Steve Avery	Braves	1
P	Rod Beck	Giants	1
P	Andy Benes	Padres	1
P	John Burkett	Giants	1
P	Tom Glavine	Braves	3
P	Bryan Harvey	Marlins	2
P	Darryl Kile	Astros	1
P	Lee Smith	Cardinals	5
P	John Smoltz	Braves	3

Reserves
Position	Player	Team	All-Star Games
C	Mike Piazza	Dodgers	1
1B	Andrés Galarraga	Rockies	2
1B	Gregg Jefferies	Cardinals	1
2B	Robby Thompson	Giants	2
3B	Dave Hollins	Phillies	1
SS	Jay Bell	Pirates	1
SS	Jeff Blauser	Braves	1
OF	Bobby Bonilla	Mets	5
OF	Tony Gwynn	Padres	9
OF	Roberto Kelly	Reds	2
OF	Andy Van Slyke	Pirates	3

Manager
Manager	Team
Bobby Cox	Atlanta Braves

Coaches
Coach	Team
Jimy Williams	Atlanta Braves
Pat Corrales	Atlanta Braves
Leo Mazzone	Atlanta Braves
Tommy Lasorda	Los Angeles Dodgers
Jim Fregosi	Philadelphia Phillies

The trainers for the National League were Dave Labossiere of the Houston Astros, and Gene Gieselmann of the St.Louis Cardinals

=== American League ===
Starters
Position	Player	Team	All-Star Games
P	Mark Langston	Angels	4
C	Iván Rodríguez	Rangers	2
1B	John Olerud	Blue Jays	1
2B	Roberto Alomar	Blue Jays	4
3B	Wade Boggs	Yankees	9
SS	Cal Ripken Jr.	Orioles	11
OF	Joe Carter	Blue Jays	3
OF	Ken Griffey Jr.	Mariners	4
OF	Kirby Puckett	Twins	8
DH	Paul Molitor	Blue Jays	6

Pitchers
Position	Player	Team	All-Star Games
P	Rick Aguilera	Twins	3
P	Pat Hentgen	Blue Jays	1
P	Randy Johnson	Mariners	2
P	Jimmy Key	Yankees	3
P	Jack McDowell	White Sox	3
P	Jeff Montgomery	Royals	2
P	Mike Mussina	Orioles	2
P	Duane Ward	Blue Jays	1

Reserves
Position	Player	Team	All-Star Games
C	Terry Steinbach	Athletics	3
1B	Cecil Fielder	Tigers	3
1B	Frank Thomas	White Sox	1
2B	Carlos Baerga	Indians	2
3B	Scott Cooper	Red Sox	1
SS	Travis Fryman	Tigers	2
OF	Albert Belle	Indians	1
OF	Juan González	Rangers	1
OF	Greg Vaughn	Brewers	1
OF	Devon White	Blue Jays	2

Manager
Manager	Team
Cito Gaston	Blue Jays

Coaches
Position	Coach	Team
Third Base	Sparky Anderson	Tigers
Pitching	Galen Cisco	Blue Jays
Hitting	Larry Hisle	Blue Jays
First Base	Johnny Oates	Orioles
Bullpen	John Sullivan	Blue Jays
Bench	Gene Tenace	Blue Jays

The trainers for the American League were Richie Bancells of the Baltimore Orioles, and Barry Weinberg of the Oakland Athletics.

== Game ==
=== Umpires ===
Home Plate	Jim McKean (AL)
First Base	Bob Davidson (NL)
Second Base	Mike Reilly (AL)
Third Base	Gary Darling (NL)
Left Field	Dale Scott (AL)
Right Field	Mark Hirschbeck (NL)

=== Starting lineups ===
National League				American League			
Order	Player	Team	Position	Order	Player	Team	Position
1	Marquis Grissom	Expos	CF	1	Roberto Alomar	Blue Jays	2B
2	Barry Bonds	Giants	LF	2	Paul Molitor	Blue Jays	DH
3	Gary Sheffield	Marlins	3B	3	Ken Griffey Jr.	Mariners	CF
4	John Kruk	Phillies	1B	4	Joe Carter	Blue Jays	RF
5	Barry Larkin	Reds	SS	5	John Olerud	Blue Jays	1B
6	Mark Grace	Cubs	DH	6	Kirby Puckett	Twins	LF
7	David Justice	Braves	RF	7	Cal Ripken Jr.	Orioles	SS
8	Darren Daulton	Phillies	C	8	Wade Boggs	Yankees	3B
9	Ryne Sandberg	Cubs	2B	9	Iván Rodríguez	Rangers	C
	Terry Mulholland	Phillies	P		Mark Langston	Angels	P

=== Game summary ===
Tuesday, July 13, 1993 8:37 pm (ET) at Oriole Park at Camden Yards in Baltimore, Maryland
Team	1	2	3	4	5	6	7	8	9	R	H	E
National League	2	0	0	0	0	1	0	0	0	3	7	2
American League	0	1	1	0	3	3	0	1	X	9	11	0
WP: Jack McDowell (1-0) LP: John Burkett (0-1); Home runs: NL: Gary Sheffield (1); AL: Kirby Puckett (1), Roberto Alomar (1)

The pregame colors presentation was from the color guard of the United States Naval Academy in Annapolis, Maryland. Geddy Lee, lead singer of the band Rush later sang the Canadian National Anthem, while actor James Earl Jones recites the U.S. National Anthem, accompanied by the Morgan State University choir. At the conclusion of the National Anthem, fireworks exploded over Fort McHenry while airplanes from Andrews Air Force Base flew over Camden Yards.

To commemorate the 35th anniversary of the 1958 Major League Baseball All-Star Game, which had been played at Memorial Stadium, Hall-of-Famer and Baltimore native Al Kaline joined the ceremonial first pitch ceremonies. Also joining the ceremonies was Orioles Hall-of-Famer Brooks Robinson. The visiting National League scored in the first inning off starting pitcher Mark Langston when Barry Bonds doubled with one out and Gary Sheffield followed with a home run for a 2-0 lead. The American League got a run back in the second when Kirby Puckett homered with one out off the NL starter, Terry Mulholland. Roberto Alomar tied the game at two in the third inning, leading off with a home run, off Andy Benes.

The AL went ahead to stay with three runs in the fifth. John Burkett came in to start the inning, and first batter Ivan Rodriguez doubled and scored on a single by Albert Belle, who went to second when Justice made an error on the play. Ken Griffey Jr., singled home Belle and went to second on the throw home. After Cecil Fielder was hit by a pitch, Kirby Puckett doubled home Griffey for the third run of the inning and a 5-2 AL lead. Steve Avery relieved to get the last out of the inning. The NL got a run back in the top of the sixth. Jimmy Key started the inning and gave up a double to Bonds, followed by a single to Sheffield and a sacrifice fly to Barry Larkin, making the score 5-3.

The AL broke the game open in the bottom of the sixth with three more runs. With two outs, Carlos Baerga reached on an error by shortstop Jeff Blauser, then Albert Belle walked. Devon White doubled home Baerga and after John Smoltz relieved Avery, Belle scored and White went to third on a wild pitch. Juan Gonzalez walked, then Smoltz threw his second wild pitch of the inning, allowing White to score the third run of the inning, giving the AL an 8-3 lead. Smoltz tied an All-Star game record with two wild pitches, but he was the first to throw them in the same inning.

The AL got the last run of the game in the seventh inning when Greg Vaughn led off with a single and scored on a two-out double by Terry Steinbach, both hits off Rod Beck, making the final score 9-3. The last out however ended strangely, when American League (Blue Jays) manager Cito Gaston allowed Blue Jays closer Duane Ward to close out the game in the ninth at Camden Yards, rather than hometown hero Mike Mussina. Fans cheered as the Orioles' Mike Mussina warmed up in the bullpen and chanted "We Want Mike!", but after the last out of the game, the fans booed Gaston for not putting in Mussina to close out the game. Fans began throwing various waste onto the field until an appeal from Mussina himself stopped the crowd. Mussina said that he warmed up so he would not mess up his regular pitching schedule, as he was going to pitch the next day. Despite this, many people believe that he started warming up so that the fans would get riled up, meaning that Gaston would most likely put him in. As it was, Mussina did not play in the All-Star Game, and Ward did not get the save.
