= Duane Ward =

American baseball player (1964–2026)

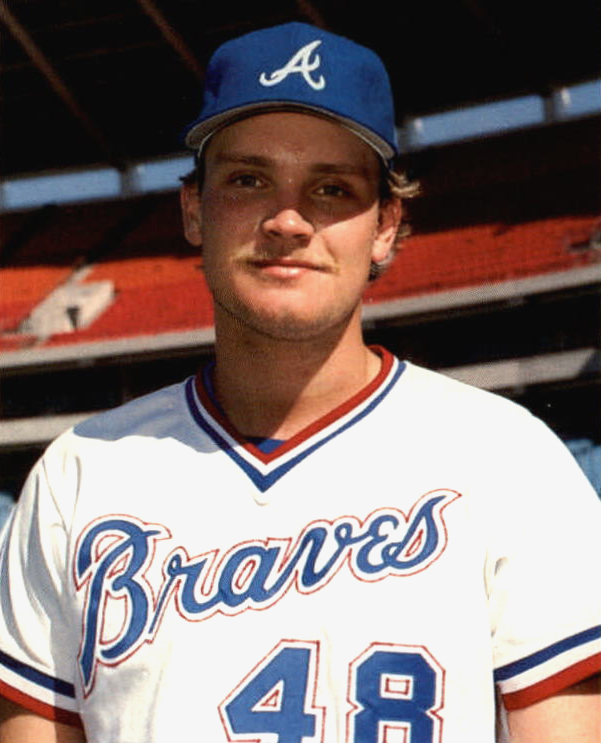
- Ward with the Atlanta Braves c. 1986
- Pitcher
- Born: May 28, 1964; Park View, New Mexico, U.S.
- Died: July 18, 2026 (aged 62); Toronto, Ontario, Canada
- Batted: Right Threw: Right

MLB debut
- April 12, 1986, for the Atlanta Braves

Last MLB appearance
- June 22, 1995, for the Toronto Blue Jays

MLB statistics
- Win–loss record: 32–37
- Earned run average: 3.28
- Strikeouts: 679
- Saves: 121
- Stats at Baseball Reference

Teams
- Atlanta Braves (1986); Toronto Blue Jays (1986–1995)

Career highlights and awards
- All-Star (1993); 2× World Series champion (1992, 1993); AL saves leader (1993)

Member of the Canadian

Baseball Hall of Fame
- Induction: 2020

Roy Duane Ward (May 28, 1964 – July 18, 2026) was an American professional baseball player. A relief pitcher, he played in Major League Baseball for the Atlanta Braves and Toronto Blue Jays from 1986 to 1995.

Ward played in American Amateur Baseball Congress and the Connie Mack World Series before he was drafted out of high school in 1982. He made his MLB debut with the Braves in 1986 and was traded to the Blue Jays that year. He was an All-Star in 1993, when he led the American League in saves, and was a member of the 1992 and 1993 World Series champions. Ward was elected to the Canadian Baseball Hall of Fame in 2020.

== Early career ==
Ward attended Farmington High School in Farmington, New Mexico. He played baseball in the American Amateur Baseball Congress and Connie Mack World Series.

The Atlanta Braves selected Ward in the first round of the 1982 MLB draft. He is tied with Jim Kremmel (1971) for the second-highest draft pick of players hailing from New Mexico, behind shortstop Alex Bregman, who was selected with the second pick in the first round of the 2015 MLB draft.

He made his major league debut with the Braves on April 12, 1986. After limited success, the Braves traded him to the Toronto Blue Jays on July 6 for pitcher Doyle Alexander.

== Setup man ==
Ward spent much of the remainder of the 1986 season and the 1987 season in the minor leagues as a relief pitcher. He began the 1988 season in the major leagues and became a set up reliever ahead of Tom Henke, the Blue Jays' closer. In 1988, Ward had a 9-3 win-loss record and 15 saves in 111 2/3 innings pitched.

== Closer ==
After the 1992 season, Tom Henke left the Blue Jays and Ward took over the closer's role in the 1993 season. In the regular season, Ward set Toronto's single-season team record for saves with 45. He was tied with Jeff Montgomery of the Kansas City Royals for most saves in the American League. Ward was the closing pitcher for the American League in its 9–3 victory at the 1993 Major League Baseball All-Star Game.

In the 1993 World Series, Ward earned two saves over the Philadelphia Phillies, in Game 1 (8–5 save, in Toronto) and in the Toronto 15–14 victory in Game 4 in Philadelphia, when Ward got the last four outs after Toronto scored the final six runs of the game. Ward was the winning pitcher for the decisive Game 6 in which Joe Carter hit a walk-off home run after Ward pitched in relief.

Ward missed the entire 1994 season due to biceps tendinitis. He retired from the Toronto Blue Jays after pitching just four games during the 1995 season. He finished his career with a 3.28 earned run average and 121 saves. He was inducted into the Canadian Baseball Hall of Fame in 2020.

== Broadcasting ==
From 2014, Ward was featured on the Blue Jays' radio broadcasts for Sportsnet 590 The Fan. He occasionally filled-in for regular colour commentator Joe Siddall.

== Death ==
The Blue Jays announced Ward's death on the morning of July 19, 2026. He died in Toronto, at the age of 62.

== See also ==
- List of Major League Baseball annual saves leaders
