= Willie Cañate =

Venezuelan baseball player

- Outfielder
- Born: December 11, 1971 (age 54); Maracaibo, Venezuela
- Batted: Right Threw: Right

MLB debut
- April 16, 1993, for the Toronto Blue Jays

Last MLB appearance
- October 3, 1993, for the Toronto Blue Jays

MLB statistics
- Batting average: .213
- Home runs: 1
- Runs batted in: 3
- Stats at Baseball Reference

Teams
- Toronto Blue Jays (1993)

Career highlights and awards
- World Series champion (1993)

Emisael William Cañate Librada (born December 11, 1971) is a Venezuelan former Major League Baseball left fielder and right-handed batter.

== Career ==
He played for the Toronto Blue Jays in 1993. The Blue Jays went on to win the World Series that season. Cañate was a career .213 hitter (10-for-47) with one home run and three RBI in 38 games.

After the 1993 season, Cañate played at the AA and AAA levels in 1994 and 1995, played one season in the Mexican League and five more seasons in Italy before retiring.

== See also ==
- List of players from Venezuela in Major League Baseball
