= Jack McDowell =

American baseball player (born 1966)

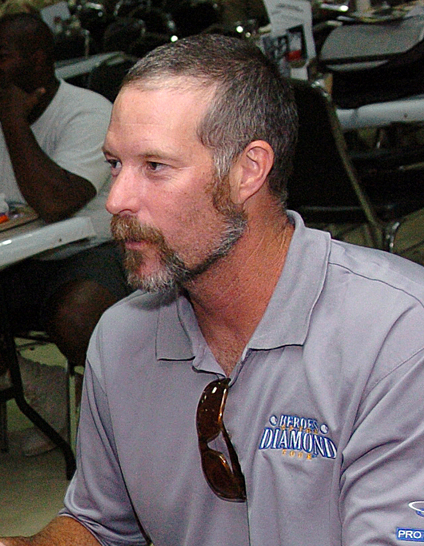
- McDowell at Camp As Sayliyah in 2007
- Pitcher
- Born: January 16, 1966 (age 60); Van Nuys, California, U.S.
- Batted: Right Threw: Right

MLB debut
- September 15, 1987, for the Chicago White Sox

Last MLB appearance
- August 8, 1999, for the Anaheim Angels

MLB statistics
- Win–loss record: 127–87
- Earned run average: 3.85
- Strikeouts: 1,311
- Stats at Baseball Reference

Teams
- Chicago White Sox (1987–1988, 1990–1994); New York Yankees (1995); Cleveland Indians (1996–1997); Anaheim Angels (1998–1999)

Career highlights and awards
- 3× All-Star (1991–1993); AL Cy Young Award (1993); AL wins leader (1993)
Medals
Men's baseball
Representing United States
World Junior Baseball Championship
Silver medal – second place	1984 Saskatoon	Team

Jack Burns McDowell (born January 16, 1966) is an American former baseball player. A right-handed pitcher, McDowell played for the Chicago White Sox, New York Yankees, Cleveland Indians, and Anaheim Angels of the Major League Baseball (MLB). Nicknamed "Black Jack", he was a three-time All-Star and won the American League Cy Young Award in 1993.

McDowell has also been a professional musician, most notably with the rock band stickfigure.

== Baseball career ==
=== Amateur career ===
McDowell attended Notre Dame High School in Sherman Oaks, California. He was drafted by the Boston Red Sox in the 20th round of the 1984 MLB draft, but did not sign.

He chose to attend Stanford University, where he was the co-Freshman of the Year in 1985, a second-team All-American in 1986 and a third-team All-American in 1987. He led the Cardinal to the 1987 College World Series championship.

=== Chicago White Sox ===
McDowell was drafted by the Chicago White Sox in the first round (fifth pick) of the 1987 amateur draft. After only six games in the minor leagues, he made his Major League debut on September 15, 1987. He pitched seven shutout innings against the Minnesota Twins that day to pick up the win. In four starts, he was 3–0 with a 1.93 ERA.

In 1988, he was 5–10 with a 3.97 ERA in 26 starts for the White Sox, but in 1989, while dealing with various injuries he did not pitch in the Majors, making 16 starts for the AAA Vancouver Canadians, where he was 5–6 with a 6.13 ERA.

By the early 1990s, he had established himself as one of the most dependable pitchers in the game, pitching effectively and recording over 250 innings each season from 1991 to 1993; he was selected to the Major League Baseball All-Star Game each of those years. He won 20 games in 1992 and 22 in 1993, when he won the American League Cy Young Award and led the White Sox to the postseason (they lost in the 1993 American League Championship Series to the Toronto Blue Jays). From 1988 until 1995, his season ERA was consistently between 3.00 and 4.00, well below the league average. In 1993, he set a modern (post-1950) record by recording a decision in each of his first 27 starts.

=== New York Yankees ===
After the 1994 season, McDowell was traded to the New York Yankees for minor league pitcher Keith Heberling and outfielder Lyle Mouton. McDowell spent one season in New York with the Yankees, ending the season 15–10 with a 3.93 ERA in 30 starts. He was perhaps best known for giving the finger to the fans at Yankee Stadium while being booed off the field after getting bombed by the White Sox on July 18, 1995, in the second game of a doubleheader. McDowell was also the pitcher who gave up the walk-off, series-winning hit to Edgar Martínez in Game 5 of the 1995 American League Division Series, scoring Joey Cora and Ken Griffey Jr. to eliminate the Yankees from the playoffs and send the Seattle Mariners to the American League Championship Series. This, coupled with the emergence of Andy Pettitte who became the team's ace the following season, resulted in the Yankees not showing interest in bringing McDowell back for a second season; he thus was forced to enter free agency.

=== Cleveland Indians ===
McDowell spent 1996–1997 with the Cleveland Indians. In 1996, he was 13–9 with a 5.11 ERA in 30 starts, but in 1997 he made only six starts due to an injury, which may have been made worse by his trying to pitch through it. McDowell's injury resulted in the emergence of rookie Jaret Wright.

=== Anaheim Angels ===
He signed as a free agent with the Anaheim Angels in 1998 but was hampered with injuries during his time with the team. He was 5–7 with a 5.68 ERA in 18 starts over two seasons with Anaheim. He was released by the Angels after the 1999 season and retired from baseball.

=== Coaching career ===
On January 29, 2014, McDowell announced on his Facebook page that he had been hired to manage the Los Angeles Dodgers Rookie League affiliate, the Ogden Raptors, in the Pioneer League. In 2015, he was named manager of the Arizona League Dodgers. The Dodgers dismissed him after the season.

On March 2, 2017, Queens University of Charlotte, in Charlotte, North Carolina, announced that McDowell would be the head coach of its new baseball team. The team competed in its first season in 2018 as a club sport before entering Division II competition in 2019. On March 27, 2020, Queens University announced that McDowell stepped down as the head coach.

He has spent the 2021 summer season as the manager of the collegiate summer team the Burlington Sock Puppets.

== Music career ==
During his baseball career, McDowell played guitar in various groups in the alternative rock genre, usually performing during the off-season.

McDowell's first band, V.I.E.W., which consisted of him and fellow baseball players Lee Plemel and Wayne Edwards, had two albums, Extendagenda and Replace the Mind. The band was formed in 1989 and disbanded in 1992. Their most notable accomplishment was touring with The Smithereens in 1992.

His second band, stickfigure, consisted of McDowell, Michael Hamilton, Mike Mesaros and Frank Funaro. They produced the albums Just a Thought, Feedbag, Ape of the Kings and Memonto Mori, before the group disbanded in 2003. In November 1993, McDowell and Pearl Jam vocalist Eddie Vedder were involved in a barroom brawl in New Orleans, Louisiana that resulted in Vedder being arrested for public drunkenness and disturbing the peace.

=== Discography ===
- Extendagenda (1991) – V.I.E.W.
- Replace the Mind (1992) – V.I.E.W.
- Just a Thought (1995) – stickfigure
- Feedbag (2001) – stickfigure
- Ape of the Kings (2002) – stickfigure
- Memonto Mori (2003) – stickfigure

== In popular culture ==
In 2008, musicians Scott McCaughey (of The Minus 5), Steve Wynn, Linda Pitmon, and Peter Buck formed The Baseball Project to pay homage to America's greatest pastime. Their album Volume 1: Frozen Ropes and Dying Quails contains the song "The Yankee Flipper", a tribute to their friend McDowell and a confession that a long night of drinking with the musicians may have led to the infamous finger to the crowd.

== See also ==
- List of Major League Baseball annual wins leaders
