= 1993 Boston Red Sox season =

Major League Baseball season

1993 Boston Red Sox
- League: American League
- Division: East
- Ballpark: Fenway Park
- City: Boston, Massachusetts
- Record: 80–82 (.494)
- Divisional place: 5th
- Owners: JRY Trust, Haywood Sullivan
- President: John Harrington
- General manager: Lou Gorman
- Manager: Butch Hobson
- Television: WSBK-TV, Ch. 38 (Sean McDonough, Bob Montgomery); NESN (Bob Kurtz, Jerry Remy)
- Radio: WRKO (Jerry Trupiano, Joe Castiglione); WROL (Bobby Serrano, Hector Martinez, Mike Fornieles)
- Stats: ESPN.com; Baseball Reference

The 1993 Boston Red Sox season was the 93rd season in the franchise's Major League Baseball history. The Red Sox finished fifth in the American League East with a record of 80 wins and 82 losses, 15 games behind the Toronto Blue Jays, who went on to win the 1993 World Series.

== Offseason ==
- December 1, 1992: Scott Fletcher was signed as a free agent by the Red Sox.
- December 8, 1992: Scott Bankhead was signed as a free agent by the Red Sox.
- December 9, 1992: Andre Dawson was signed as a free agent by the Red Sox.
- December 9, 1992: Phil Plantier was traded by the Boston Red Sox to the San Diego Padres for Jose Melendez.
- January 18, 1993: Tony Fossas was signed as a free agent by the Red Sox.
- March 1, 1993: Jeff Russell was signed as a free agent by the Red Sox.

== Spring training ==
In a spring training game on April 2, 1993, Frank Viola and Cory Bailey combined on a no-hitter as the Red Sox defeated the Philadelphia Phillies, 10–0, at Jack Russell Memorial Stadium in Clearwater, Florida.

== Regular season ==
Record by month
| Month | Record | | Cumulative | | AL East | | Ref. |
| Month | Won | Lost | Won | Lost | Position | GB | Ref. |
|---|---|---|---|---|---|---|---|
| April | 13 | 9 | 13 | 9 | 2nd | 2 | |
| May | 14 | 14 | 27 | 23 | 4th | 4 | |
| June | 11 | 16 | 38 | 39 | 5th | 9 | |
| July | 20 | 7 | 58 | 46 | 3rd | 1 1/2 | |
| August | 11 | 16 | 69 | 62 | 5th | 6 1/2 | |
| September | 11 | 17 | 80 | 79 | 5th | 14 | |
| October | 0 | 3 | 80 | 82 | 5th | 15 | |

=== Season standings ===
AL East
| Team | W | L | Pct. | GB | Home | Road |
|---|---|---|---|---|---|---|
| Toronto Blue Jays | 95 | 67 | .586 | — | 48‍–‍33 | 47‍–‍34 |
| New York Yankees | 88 | 74 | .543 | 7 | 50‍–‍31 | 38‍–‍43 |
| Baltimore Orioles | 85 | 77 | .525 | 10 | 48‍–‍33 | 37‍–‍44 |
| Detroit Tigers | 85 | 77 | .525 | 10 | 44‍–‍37 | 41‍–‍40 |
| Boston Red Sox | 80 | 82 | .494 | 15 | 43‍–‍38 | 37‍–‍44 |
| Cleveland Indians | 76 | 86 | .469 | 19 | 46‍–‍35 | 30‍–‍51 |
| Milwaukee Brewers | 69 | 93 | .426 | 26 | 38‍–‍43 | 31‍–‍50 |

=== Record vs. opponents ===
1993 American League record Source: MLB Standings Grid – 1993
| Team | BAL | BOS | CAL | CWS | CLE | DET | KC | MIL | MIN | NYY | OAK | SEA | TEX | TOR |
|---|---|---|---|---|---|---|---|---|---|---|---|---|---|---|
| Baltimore | — | 6–7 | 7–5 | 4–8 | 8–5 | 5–8 | 7–5 | 8–5 | 8–4 | 6–7 | 10–2 | 7–5 | 4–8 | 5–8 |
| Boston | 7–6 | — | 7–5 | 7–5 | 5–8 | 6–7 | 5–7 | 5–8 | 7–5 | 6–7 | 9–3 | 7–5 | 6–6 | 3–10 |
| California | 5–7 | 5–7 | — | 7–6 | 5–7 | 4–8 | 6–7 | 7–5 | 4–9 | 6–6 | 6–7 | 6–7 | 6–7 | 4–8 |
| Chicago | 8–4 | 5–7 | 6–7 | — | 9–3 | 7–5 | 6–7 | 9–3 | 10–3 | 4–8 | 7–6 | 9–4 | 8–5 | 6–6 |
| Cleveland | 5–8 | 8–5 | 7–5 | 3–9 | — | 6–7 | 7–5 | 8–5 | 4–8 | 6–7 | 8–4 | 3–9 | 7–5 | 4–9 |
| Detroit | 8–5 | 7–6 | 8–4 | 5–7 | 7–6 | — | 5–7 | 8–5 | 6–6 | 4–9 | 8–4 | 7–5 | 6–6 | 6–7 |
| Kansas City | 5–7 | 7–5 | 7–6 | 7–6 | 5–7 | 7–5 | — | 5–7 | 7–6 | 6–6 | 6–7 | 7–6 | 7–6 | 8–4 |
| Milwaukee | 5–8 | 8–5 | 5–7 | 3–9 | 5–8 | 5–8 | 7–5 | — | 7–5 | 4–9 | 7–5 | 4–8 | 4–8 | 5–8 |
| Minnesota | 4–8 | 5–7 | 9–4 | 3–10 | 8–4 | 6–6 | 6–7 | 5–7 | — | 4–8 | 8–5 | 4–9 | 7–6 | 2–10 |
| New York | 7–6 | 7–6 | 6–6 | 8–4 | 7–6 | 9–4 | 6–6 | 9–4 | 8–4 | — | 6–6 | 7–5 | 3–9 | 5–8 |
| Oakland | 2–10 | 3–9 | 7–6 | 6–7 | 4–8 | 4–8 | 7–6 | 5–7 | 5–8 | 6–6 | — | 9–4 | 5–8 | 5–7 |
| Seattle | 5–7 | 5–7 | 7–6 | 4–9 | 9–3 | 5–7 | 6–7 | 8–4 | 9–4 | 5–7 | 4–9 | — | 8–5 | 7–5 |
| Texas | 8–4 | 6–6 | 7–6 | 5–8 | 5–7 | 6–6 | 6–7 | 8–4 | 6–7 | 9–3 | 8–5 | 5–8 | — | 7–5 |
| Toronto | 8–5 | 10–3 | 8–4 | 6–6 | 9–4 | 7–6 | 4–8 | 8–5 | 10–2 | 8–5 | 7–5 | 5–7 | 5–7 | — |

=== Notable transactions ===
- April 3, 1993: Ernest Riles was signed as a free agent by the Red Sox.
- May 7, 1993: Steve Lyons was signed as a free agent by the Red Sox.
- June 3, 1993: Trot Nixon was drafted by the Red Sox in the 1st round of the 1993 MLB draft. Player signed August 31, 1993.
- June 3, 1993: Jeff Suppan was drafted by the Red Sox in the 2nd round of the 1993 MLB draft. Player signed June 29, 1993.
- June 3, 1993: Lou Merloni was drafted by the Red Sox in the 10th round of the 1993 MLB draft. Player signed June 5, 1993.
- August 17, 1993: Iván Calderón was released by the Red Sox.

=== Opening Day lineup ===
| 5 | Scott Fletcher | 2B |
| 22 | Billy Hatcher | CF |
| 39 | Mike Greenwell | LF |
| 10 | Andre Dawson | RF |
| 42 | Mo Vaughn | 1B |
| 22 | Iván Calderón | DH |
| 34 | Scott Cooper | 3B |
| 6 | Tony Peña | C |
| 2 | Luis Rivera | SS |
| 21 | Roger Clemens | P |

=== Alumni game ===
On May 29, the Red Sox held an old-timers game, themed to honor Negro league legends; it was held before a scheduled home game with the Texas Rangers. Hitting instructor Mike Easler drove in both runs for the Red Sox alumni team in a 2–2 tie; other participants included César Cedeño, Jim Lonborg, and Roy White.

=== Roster ===
1993 Boston Red Sox
Roster
| Pitchers: 43 Cory Bailey; 29 Scott Bankhead; 21 Roger Clemens; 44 Danny Darwin; 40 John Dopson; 48 Tony Fossas; 27 Greg Harris; 55 Joe Hesketh; 19 José Meléndez; 57 Nate Minchey; 49 Paul Quantrill; 25 Jeff Russell; 50 Ken Ryan; 36 Aaron Sele; 56 Scott Taylor; 16 Frank Viola | Catchers: 15 John Flaherty; 3 Bob Melvin; 6 Tony Peña; Infielders: 34 Scott Cooper; 5 Scott Fletcher; 11 Tim Naehring; 51 Luis Ortiz; 18 Carlos Quintana; 20 Jeff Richardson; 12 Ernest Riles; 2 Luis Rivera; 13 John Valentin; 42 Mo Vaughn | Outfielders: 47 Greg Blosser; 23 Iván Calderón; 23 Rob Deer; 39 Mike Greenwell; 22 Billy Hatcher; 30 Steve Lyons; 58 Jeff McNeely; 28 Bob Zupcic; Other batters: 10 Andre Dawson; Pinch runner: 30 Jim Byrd | Manager: 17 Butch Hobson; Coaches: 32 Gary Allenson (Bullpen); 37 Al Bumbry (First base); 7 Rick Burleson (Third base); 45 Mike Easler (Hitting); 35 Rich Gale (Pitching) |

== Player stats ==
=== Batting ===
==== Starters by position ====
Note: Pos = Position; G = Games played; AB = At bats; H = Hits; Avg. = Batting average; HR = Home runs; RBI = Runs batted in

| Pos | Player | G | AB | H | Avg. | HR | RBI |
|---|---|---|---|---|---|---|---|
| C | Tony Pena | 126 | 304 | 55 | .181 | 4 | 19 |
| 1B | Mo Vaughn | 152 | 539 | 160 | .297 | 29 | 101 |
| 2B | Scott Fletcher | 121 | 480 | 137 | .285 | 5 | 45 |
| 3B | Scott Cooper | 156 | 468 | 147 | .279 | 9 | 63 |
| SS | John Valentin | 144 | 468 | 130 | .278 | 11 | 66 |
| LF | Mike Greenwell | 146 | 540 | 170 | .315 | 13 | 72 |
| CF | Billy Hatcher | 136 | 508 | 146 | .287 | 9 | 57 |
| RF | Carlos Quintana | 101 | 303 | 74 | .244 | 1 | 19 |
| DH | Andre Dawson | 121 | 461 | 126 | .273 | 13 | 67 |

==== Other batters ====
Note: G = Games played; AB = At bats; H = Hits; Avg. = Batting average; HR = Home runs; RBI = Runs batted in

| Player | G | AB | H | Avg. | HR | RBI |
|---|---|---|---|---|---|---|
| Bob Zupcic | 141 | 286 | 69 | .241 | 2 | 26 |
| Iván Calderón | 73 | 213 | 47 | .221 | 1 | 19 |
| Bob Melvin | 77 | 176 | 39 | .222 | 3 | 23 |
| Rob Deer | 38 | 143 | 18 | .196 | 7 | 16 |
| Ernie Riles | 94 | 143 | 27 | .189 | 5 | 20 |
| Luis Rivera | 62 | 130 | 27 | .208 | 1 | 7 |
| Tim Naehring | 39 | 127 | 42 | .331 | 1 | 17 |
| Jeff McNeely | 21 | 37 | 11 | .297 | 0 | 1 |
| Greg Blosser | 17 | 28 | 2 | .071 | 0 | 1 |
| John Flaherty | 13 | 25 | 3 | .120 | 0 | 2 |
| Jeff Richardson | 15 | 24 | 5 | .208 | 0 | 2 |
| Steve Lyons | 28 | 23 | 3 | .130 | 0 | 0 |
| Luis Ortiz | 9 | 12 | 3 | .250 | 0 | 1 |
| Jim Byrd | 2 | 0 | 0 | ---- | 0 | 0 |

=== Pitching ===
==== Starting pitching ====
Note: G = Games pitched; IP = Innings pitched; W = Wins; L = Losses; ERA = Earned run average; SO = Strikeouts

| Player | G | IP | W | L | ERA | SO |
|---|---|---|---|---|---|---|
| Danny Darwin | 34 | 229.1 | 15 | 11 | 3.26 | 130 |
| Roger Clemens | 29 | 191.2 | 11 | 14 | 4.46 | 160 |
| Frank Viola | 29 | 183.2 | 11 | 8 | 3.14 | 91 |
| John Dopson | 34 | 155.2 | 7 | 11 | 4.97 | 89 |
| Aaron Sele | 18 | 111.2 | 7 | 2 | 2.74 | 93 |
| Nate Minchey | 5 | 33.0 | 1 | 2 | 3.55 | 18 |

==== Relief and other pitchers ====
Note: G = Games pitched; IP = Innings pitched; W = Wins; L = Losses; ERA = Earned run average; SV = Saves

| Player | G | IP | W | L | ERA | SV |
|---|---|---|---|---|---|---|
| Paul Quantrill | 49 | 138.0 | 6 | 12 | 3.91 | 1 |
| Greg A. Harris | 80 | 112.1 | 6 | 7 | 3.77 | 8 |
| Scott Bankhead | 40 | 64.1 | 2 | 1 | 3.50 | 0 |
| Joe Hesketh | 28 | 53.1 | 3 | 4 | 5.06 | 1 |
| Ken Ryan | 47 | 50.0 | 7 | 2 | 3.60 | 1 |
| Jeff Russell | 51 | 46.2 | 1 | 4 | 2.70 | 33 |
| Tony Fossas | 71 | 40.0 | 1 | 1 | 5.18 | 0 |
| José Meléndez | 9 | 16.0 | 2 | 1 | 2.25 | 0 |
| Cory Bailey | 11 | 15.2 | 0 | 1 | 3.45 | 0 |
| Scott Taylor | 16 | 11.0 | 0 | 1 | 8.18 | 0 |

== Awards and honors ==
- Danny Darwin – AL Pitcher of the Month (May)

All-Star Game

- Scott Cooper, reserve 3B

== Farm system ==
The Fort Lauderdale Red Sox replaced the Winter Haven Red Sox as a Class A-Advanced affiliate. The Utica Blue Sox replaced the Elmira Pioneers as the Red Sox' Class A-Short Season affiliate.

| Level | Team | League | Manager |
|---|---|---|---|
| AAA | Pawtucket Red Sox | International League | Buddy Bailey |
| AA | New Britain Red Sox | Eastern League | Jim Pankovits |
| A-Advanced | Lynchburg Red Sox | Carolina League | Mark Meleski |
| A-Advanced | Fort Lauderdale Red Sox | Florida State League | DeMarlo Hale |
| A-Short Season | Utica Blue Sox | New York–Penn League | Dave Holt |
| Rookie | GCL Red Sox | Gulf Coast League | Felix Maldonado |

== Game log ==
| Red Sox Win | Red Sox Loss | Game postponed |

1993 Boston Red Sox Season Game Log: 80–82 (Home: 43–38; Away: 37–44)
April: 13–9

| # | Date | Opponent | Score | Win | Loss | Save | Stadium | Attendance | Record | Streak |
|---|---|---|---|---|---|---|---|---|---|---|
| 1 | April 5 | @ Royals | 3–1 | Clemens (1–0) | Appier (0–1) | Russell (1) | Kauffman Stadium | 39,532 | 1–0 | W1 |
| 2 | April 7 | @ Royals | 3–2 | Viola (1–0) | Cone (0–1) | Russell (2) | Kauffman Stadium | 14,911 | 2–0 | W2 |
| 3 | April 8 | @ Royals | 9–4 | Bankhead (1–0) | Gubicza (0–1) | — | Kauffman Stadium | 15,777 | 3–0 | W3 |
| 4 | April 9 | @ Rangers | 1–3 | Ryan (1–0) | Dopson (0–1) | Henke (2) | Arlington Stadium | 40,188 | 3–1 | L1 |
| 5 | April 10 | @ Rangers | 10–2 | Clemens (2–0) | Lefferts (1–1) | — | Arlington Stadium | 30,610 | 4–1 | W1 |
| 6 | April 11 | @ Rangers | 1–4 | Brown (1–0) | Darwin (0–1) | Henke (3) | Arlington Stadium | 22,743 | 4–2 | L1 |
| — | April 12 | Indians | Postponed (rain). Makeup date April 13. | | | | | | | |
| 7 | April 13 | Indians | 6–2 | Viola (2–0) | Mutis (0–1) | — | Fenway Park | 29,606 | 5–2 | W1 |
| 8 | April 14 | Indians | 12–7 | Hesketh (1–0) | Bielecki (1–1) | — | Fenway Park | 20,390 | 6–2 | W2 |
| 9 | April 15 | Indians | 4–3 (13) | Quantrill (1–0) | Plunk (1–1) | — | Fenway Park | 22,505 | 7–2 | W3 |
| 10 | April 16 | White Sox | 4–9 | McDowell (3–0) | Darwin (0–2) | — | Fenway Park | 26,526 | 7–3 | L1 |
| 11 | April 17 | White Sox | 5–1 | Hesketh (2–0) | McKaskill (0–3) | — | Fenway Park | 32,994 | 8–3 | W1 |
| 12 | April 18 | White Sox | 4–0 | Viola (3–0) | Bolton (0–2) | — | Fenway Park | 34,923 | 9–3 | W2 |
| 13 | April 19 | White Sox | 6–0 | Dopson (1–1) | Fernandez (2–1) | — | Fenway Park | 34,556 | 10–3 | W3 |
| 14 | April 20 | @ Mariners | 5–2 | Clemens (3–0) | Cummings (0–3) | Russell (3) | Kingdome | 28,714 | 11–3 | W4 |
| 15 | April 21 | @ Mariners | 0–5 | Johnson (2–1) | Darwin (0–3) | — | Kingdome | 13,641 | 11–4 | L1 |
| 16 | April 22 | @ Mariners | 0–7 | Bosio (1–1) | Hesketh (1–1) | — | Jacobs Field | 13,604 | 11–5 | L2 |
| 17 | April 23 | @ Angels | 1–4 | Langston (2–0) | Viola (3–1) | — | Anaheim Stadium | 37,463 | 11–6 | L3 |
| 18 | April 24 | @ Angels | 5–8 | Crim (2–0) | Bankhead (1–1) | Valera (2) | Anaheim Stadium | 53,394 | 11–7 | L4 |
| 19 | April 25 | @ Angels | 1–2 | Sanderson (3–0) | Clemens (3–1) | Grahe (2) | Anaheim Stadium | 39,795 | 11–8 | L5 |
| 20 | April 27 | @ Athletics | 2–7 | Witt (1–0) | Darwin (0–4) | Gossage (1) | Oakland-Alameda County Coliseum | 20,046 | 11–9 | L6 |
| 21 | April 28 | @ Athletics | 3–1 | Viola (4–1) | Welch (2–2) | Russell (4) | Oakland-Alameda County Coliseum | 20,783 | 12–9 | W1 |
| 22 | April 30 | Angels | 6–1 | Dopson (2–1) | Farrell (1–3) | — | Fenway Park | 31,432 | 13–9 | W2 |

May: 14–14

| # | Date | Opponent | Score | Win | Loss | Save | Stadium | Attendance | Record | Streak |
|---|---|---|---|---|---|---|---|---|---|---|
| 23 | May 1 | Angels | 3–1 | Clemens (4–1) | Sanderson (3–1) | Russell (5) | Fenway Park | 33,546 | 14–9 | W3 |
| 24 | May 2 | Angels | 4–3 | Darwin (1–4) | Finley (2–2) | Russell (6) | Fenway Park | 31,851 | 15–9 | W4 |
| 25 | May 3 | Mariners | 0–2 | Hanson (4–0) | Viola (4–2) | Charlton (4) | Fenway Park | 20,379 | 15–10 | L1 |
| 26 | May 4 | Mariners | 6–7 | Leary (1–1) | Hesketh (2–2) | Charlton (5) | Fenway Park | 21,234 | 15–11 | L2 |
| 27 | May 5 | Athletics | 3–1 | Quantrill (2–0) | Núñez (0–1) | Russell (7) | Fenway Park | 25,496 | 16–11 | W1 |
| 28 | May 6 | Athletics | 3–6 | Witt (2–1) | Clemens (4–2) | Eckersley (4) | Fenway Park | 28,220 | 16–12 | L1 |
| 29 | May 7 | @ Brewers | 1–0 | Darwin (2–4) | Wegman (2–5) | Russell (8) | Milwaukee County Stadium | 15,058 | 17–12 | W1 |
| 30 | May 8 | @ Brewers | 3–6 | Eldred (4–3) | Quantrill (2–1) | Henry (6) | Milwaukee County Stadium | 25,150 | 17–13 | L1 |
| 31 | May 9 | @ Brewers | 0–6 | Boddicker (2–1) | Hesketh (2–3) | — | Milwaukee County Stadium | 20,398 | 17–14 | L2 |
| 32 | May 10 | @ Orioles | 1–2 | Frohwirth (2–2) | Quantrill (2–2) | Pennington (1) | Camden Yards | 46,372 | 17–15 | L3 |
| 33 | May 11 | @ Orioles | 4–0 | Clemens (5–2) | McDonald (2–4) | — | Camden Yards | 46,460 | 18–15 | W1 |
| 34 | May 12 | @ Orioles | 2–0 | Darwin (3–4) | Valenzuela (0–3) | Russell (9) | Camden Yards | 46,075 | 19–15 | W2 |
| 35 | May 14 | @ Twins | 3–4 | Erickson (2–4) | Viola (4–3) | Aguilera (11) | Metrodome | 26,907 | 19–16 | L1 |
| 36 | May 15 | @ Twins | 4–7 | Deshaies (5–2) | Dopson (2–2) | Aguilera (12) | Metrodome | 33,635 | 19–17 | L2 |
| 37 | May 16 | @ Twins | 11–5 | Hesketh (3–3) | Hartley (0–2) | — | Metrodome | 35,467 | 20–17 | W1 |
| 38 | May 17 | Blue Jays | 3–9 | Hentgen (5–2) | Clemens (5–3) | — | Fenway Park | 30,057 | 20–18 | L1 |
| — | May 18 | Blue Jays | Postponed (rain). Makeup date May 20. | | | | | | | |
| 39 | May 19 | Blue Jays | 10–5 | Darwin (4–4) | Stewart (0–1) | — | Fenway Park | 27,465 | 21–18 | W1 |
| 40 | May 20 | Blue Jays | 3–4 | Cox (3–0) | Quantrill (2–3) | Ward (10) | Fenway Park | 18,219 | 21–19 | L1 |
| 41 | May 21 | Yankees | 7–2 | Dopson (3–2) | Pérez (2–3) | — | Fenway Park | 34,170 | 22–19 | W1 |
| 42 | May 22 | Yankees | 3–7 | Witt (3–1) | Clemens (5–4) | — | Fenway Park | 34,383 | 22–20 | L1 |
| 43 | May 23 | Yankees | 5–2 | Harris (1–0) | Key (4–2) | Russell (10) | Fenway Park | 33,307 | 23–20 | W1 |
| 44 | May 24 | @ Tigers | 6–5 (10) | Ryan (1–0) | MacDonald (3–2) | Russell (11) | Tiger Stadium | 14,881 | 24–20 | W2 |
| 45 | May 25 | @ Tigers | 1–4 | Wells (6–1) | Viola (4–4) | Henneman (10) | Tiger Stadium | 17,514 | 24–21 | L1 |
| 46 | May 26 | @ Tigers | 6–7 | Gullickson (2–1) | Dopson (3–3) | Knudsen (1) | Tiger Stadium | 27,032 | 24–22 | L2 |
| 47 | May 28 | Rangers | 4–1 | Clemens (6–4) | Pavlik (1–1) | Russell (12) | Fenway Park | 32,678 | 25–22 | W1 |
| 48 | May 29 | Rangers | 15–1 | Darwin (5–4) | Burns (0–2) | — | Fenway Park | 32,817 | 26–22 | W2 |
| 49 | May 30 | Rangers | 6–5 (12) | Meléndez (1–0) | Bronkey (0–1) | — | Fenway Park | 33,797 | 27–22 | W3 |
| 50 | May 31 | Royals | 3–5 | Cone (3–5) | Dopson (3–4) | Montgomery (16) | Fenway Park | 21,487 | 27–23 | L1 |

June: 11–16

| # | Date | Opponent | Score | Win | Loss | Save | Stadium | Attendance | Record | Streak |
|---|---|---|---|---|---|---|---|---|---|---|
| 51 | June 1 | Royals | 3–4 | Haney (3–0) | Quantrill (2–4) | Montgomery (17) | Fenway Park | 23,418 | 27–24 | L2 |
| 52 | June 2 | Royals | 2–7 | Appier (6–4) | Clemens (6–5) | — | Fenway Park | 29,541 | 27–25 | L3 |
| 53 | June 4 | @ White Sox | 1–0 | Harris (2–0) | Hernández (1–2) | Russell (13) | Comiskey Park | 30,949 | 28–25 | W1 |
| 54 | June 5 | @ White Sox | 3–11 | McDowell (8–4) | Viola (4–5) | — | Comiskey Park | 41,144 | 28–26 | L1 |
| 55 | June 6 | White Sox | 3–4 | Fernandez (7–3) | Meléndez (1–1) | Hernández (10) | Comiskey Park | 42,393 | 28–27 | L2 |
| — | June 7 | @ Indians | Postponed (rain). Makeup date September 10. | | | | | | | |
| 56 | June 8 | @ Indians | 4–5 | Lilliquist (2–1) | Harris (2–1) | — | Cleveland Stadium | 14,168 | 28–28 | L3 |
| 57 | June 9 | @ Indians | 2–3 | Young (2–2) | Darwin (5–5) | Plunk (4) | Cleveland Stadium | 13,381 | 28–29 | L4 |
| 58 | June 10 | Orioles | 1–2 | Moyer (1–3) | Viola (4–6) | Olson (16) | Fenway Park | 33,069 | 28–30 | L5 |
| 59 | June 11 | Orioles | 4–16 | Mussina (9–2) | Dopson (3–5) | — | Fenway Park | 33,008 | 28–31 | L6 |
| 60 | June 12 | Orioles | 1–5 | Pennington (3–1) | Harris (2–2) | — | Fenway Park | 33,222 | 28–32 | L7 |
| 61 | June 13 | Orioles | 4–2 | Clemens (7–5) | Valenzuela (2–6) | Russell (14) | Fenway Park | 33,356 | 29–32 | W1 |
| 62 | June 14 | @ Yankees | 0–4 | Kamieniecki (1–1) | Darwin (5–6) | — | Yankee Stadium | 25,227 | 29–33 | L1 |
| 63 | June 15 | @ Yankees | 7–9 | Heaton (1–0) | Viola (4–7) | Farr (16) | Yankee Stadium | 30,647 | 29–34 | L2 |
| 64 | June 16 | @ Yankees | 7–1 | Dopson (4–5) | Pérez (4–6) | — | Yankee Stadium | 28,326 | 30–34 | W1 |
| 65 | June 17 | @ Blue Jays | 0–7 | Leiter (4–5) | Quantrill (2–5) | — | SkyDome | 50,528 | 30–35 | L1 |
| 66 | June 18 | @ Blue Jays | 2–11 | Hentgen (9–2) | Clemens (7–6) | — | SkyDome | 50,509 | 30–36 | L2 |
| 67 | June 19 | @ Blue Jays | 4–9 | Stewart (3–2) | Darwin (5–7) | — | SkyDome | 50,510 | 30–37 | L3 |
| 68 | June 20 | @ Blue Jays | 2–3 (12) | Timlin (1–1) | Russell (0–1) | — | SkyDome | 50,520 | 30–38 | L4 |
| 69 | June 21 | Twins | 6–3 | Dopson (5–5) | Erickson (3–8) | Russell (15) | Fenway Park | 27,779 | 31–38 | W1 |
| 70 | June 22 | Twins | 4–1 | Quantrill (3–5) | Deshaies (8–5) | Russell (16) | Fenway Park | 29,094 | 32–38 | W2 |
| 71 | June 23 | Twins | 3–1 | Sele (1–0) | Guardado (0–2) | Harris (1) | Fenway Park | 30,414 | 33–38 | W3 |
| 72 | June 25 | Tigers | 8–2 | Darwin (6–7) | Wells (9–2) | Harris (2) | Fenway Park | 33,844 | 34–38 | W4 |
| 73 | June 26 | Tigers | 13–4 | Meléndez (2–1) | Doherty (7–3) | — | Fenway Park | 33,295 | 35–38 | W5 |
| 74 | June 27 | Tigers | 6–9 | Dopson (6–5) | Gullickson (4–4) | — | Fenway Park | 32,947 | 36–38 | W6 |
| 75 | June 28 | Brewers | 4–3 | Harris (3–2) | Henry (0–2) | — | Fenway Park | 27,982 | 37–38 | W7 |
| 76 | June 29 | Brewers | 6–7 | Fetters (2–0) | Harris (3–3) | Henry (14) | Fenway Park | 30,395 | 37–39 | L1 |
| 77 | June 30 | Brewers | 12–2 | Darwin (7–7) | Miranda (0–1) | — | Fenway Park | 28,050 | 38–39 | W1 |

July: 20–7

| # | Date | Opponent | Score | Win | Loss | Save | Stadium | Attendance | Record | Streak |
|---|---|---|---|---|---|---|---|---|---|---|
| 78 | July 2 | @ Mariners | 9–8 | Viola (5–7) | Hampton (1–3) | Russell (17) | Kingdome | 23,657 | 39–39 | W2 |
| 79 | July 3 | @ Mariners | 6–5 | Harris (4–3) | Charlton (1–2) | Russell (18) | Kingdome | 31,433 | 40–39 | W3 |
| 80 | July 4 | @ Mariners | 6–0 | Quantrill (4–5) | Bosio (2–4) | — | Kingdome | 20,814 | 41–39 | W4 |
| 81 | July 5 | @ Angels | 4–3 (11) | Ryan (2–0) | Nelson (0–2) | — | Anaheim Stadium | 20,442 | 42–39 | W5 |
| 82 | July 6 | @ Angels | 2–3 | Finley (10–6) | Hesketh (3–4) | — | Anaheim Stadium | 19,996 | 42–40 | L1 |
| 83 | July 7 | @ Angels | 6–7 | Linton (1–1) | Russell (0–2) | — | Anaheim Stadium | 29,147 | 42–41 | L2 |
| 84 | July 8 | @ Athletics | 11–9 | Dopson (7–5) | Van Poppel (0–1) | Russell (19) | Oakland-Alameda County Coliseum | 23,197 | 43–41 | W1 |
| 85 | July 9 | @ Athletics | 2–4 | Darling (2–4) | Quantrill (4–6) | Eckersley (21) | Oakland-Alameda County Coliseum | 29,901 | 43–42 | L1 |
| 86 | July 10 | @ Athletics | 5–0 | Sele (2–0) | Downs (2–3) | Harris (3) | Oakland-Alameda County Coliseum | 32,202 | 44–42 | W1 |
| 87 | July 11 | @ Athletics | 3–2 | Darwin (8–7) | Witt (8–6) | Russell (20) | Oakland-Alameda County Coliseum | 34,097 | 45–42 | W2 |
| 88 | July 15 | Mariners | 2–3 | Fleming (5–1) | Viola (5–8) | Hampton (1) | Fenway Park | 33,342 | 45–43 | L1 |
| 89 | July 16 | Mariners | 5–3 | Clemens (8–6) | Hanson (7–7) | Russell (21) | Fenway Park | 33,925 | 46–43 | W1 |
| 90 | July 17 | Mariners | 12–11 | Darwin (9–7) | Bosio (3–5) | Russell (22) | Fenway Park | 33,190 | 47–43 | W2 |
| 91 | July 18 | Mariners | 7–6 | Ryan (3–0) | Charlton (1–3) | Harris (4) | Fenway Park | 33,795 | 48–43 | W3 |
| 92 | July 19 | Angels | 8–6 | Sele (3–0) | Sanderson (7–10) | Russell (23) | Fenway Park | 30,433 | 49–43 | W4 |
| 93 | July 20 | Angels | 2–1 | Fossas (1–0) | Nelson (0–3) | — | Fenway Park | 31,632 | 50–43 | W5 |
| 94 | July 21 | Angels | 4–1 | Clemens (9–6) | Finley (11–7) | Russell (24) | Fenway Park | 34,348 | 51–43 | W6 |
| 95 | July 22 | Athletics | 9–7 | Ryan (4–0) | Núñez (3–5) | Russell (25) | Fenway Park | 34,355 | 52–43 | W7 |
| 96 | July 23 | Athletics | 6–5 (10) | Harris (5–3) | Gossage (4–5) | — | Fenway Park | 34,435 | 53–43 | W8 |
| 97 | July 24 | Athletics | 5–3 | Sele (4–0) | Downs (2–5) | Russell (26) | Fenway Park | 34,379 | 54–43 | W9 |
| 98 | July 25 | Athletics | 8–1 | Viola (6–8) | Welch (7–7) | Quantrill (1) | Fenway Park | 34,391 | 55–43 | W10 |
| 99 | July 26 | @ Brewers | 2–3 | Lloyd (3–1) | Russell (0–3) | — | Milwaukee County Stadium | 24,645 | 55–44 | L1 |
| 100 | July 27 | @ Brewers | 2–3 | Navarro (6–8) | Darwin (9–8) | Orosco (2) | Milwaukee County Stadium | 18,869 | 55–45 | L2 |
| 101 | July 28 | @ Brewers | 8–4 | Harris (6–3) | Miranda (0–2) | — | Milwaukee County Stadium | 26,770 | 56–45 | W1 |
| 102 | July 29 | @ Brewers | 7–3 | Sele (5–0) | Bones (6–7) | — | Milwaukee County Stadium | 27,105 | 57–45 | W2 |
| 103 | July 30 | @ Orioles | 8–7 | Quantrill (5–6) | Moyer (7–5) | Russell (27) | Camden Yards | 46,167 | 58–45 | W3 |
| 104 | July 31 | @ Orioles | 0–4 | McDonald (8–9) | Clemens (9–7) | — | Camden Yards | 46,489 | 58–46 | L1 |

August: 11–16

| # | Date | Opponent | Score | Win | Loss | Save | Stadium | Attendance | Record | Streak |
|---|---|---|---|---|---|---|---|---|---|---|
| 105 | August 1 | @ Orioles | 2–1 | Darwin (10–8) | Sutcliffe (8–7) | Russell (28) | Camden Yards | 45,299 | 59–46 | W1 |
| 106 | August 3 | @ Twins | 1–6 | Banks (8–7) | Dopson (7–6) | — | Metrodome | 27,497 | 59–47 | L1 |
| 107 | August 4 | @ Twins | 5–4 | Sele (6–0) | Erickson (6–13) | Russell (29) | Metrodome | 24,352 | 60–47 | W1 |
| 108 | August 5 | @ Twins | 2–1 | Viola (7–8) | Deshaies (11–9) | Russell (30) | Metrodome | 30,715 | 61–47 | W2 |
| 109 | August 6 | @ Tigers | 1–5 | Gullickson (7–6) | Clemens (9–8) | — | Tiger Stadium | 32,206 | 61–48 | L1 |
| 110 | August 7 | @ Tigers | 4–1 | Darwin (11–8) | Bergman (1–4) | Russell (31) | Tiger Stadium | 38,112 | 62–48 | W1 |
| 111 | August 8 | @ Tigers | 1–5 | Bolton (2–4) | Dopson (7–7) | — | Tiger Stadium | 38,016 | 62–49 | L1 |
| 112 | August 10 | Yankees | 5–0 | Viola (8–8) | Kamieniecki (7–4) | Hesketh (1) | Fenway Park | 34,413 | 63–49 | W1 |
| 113 | August 11 | Yankees | 3–8 | Key (14–4) | Clemens (9–9) | Wickman (1) | Fenway Park | 34,470 | 63–50 | L1 |
| 114 | August 12 | Yankees | 1–4 | Pérez (6–10) | Sele (6–1) | Farr (22) | Fenway Park | 34,403 | 63–51 | L2 |
| 115 | August 13 | Blue Jays | 5–3 | Darwin (12–8) | Stottlemyre (6–9) | Russell (32) | Fenway Park | 34,276 | 64–51 | W1 |
| 116 | August 14 | Blue Jays | 2–5 | Hentgen (14–6) | Dopson (7–8) | Ward (31) | Fenway Park | 33,924 | 64–52 | L1 |
| 117 | August 15 | Blue Jays | 1–9 | Stewart (8–6) | Clemens (9–10) | — | Fenway Park | 33,380 | 64–53 | L2 |
| 118 | August 17 | White Sox | 2–3 | McDowell (19–7) | Sele (6–2) | Hernández (26) | Fenway Park | 32,744 | 64–54 | L3 |
| 119 | August 18 | White Sox | 5–0 | Darwin (13–8) | Bere (5–5) | — | Fenway Park | 31,550 | 65–54 | W1 |
| 120 | August 19 | Indians | 1–5 | Tavárez (2–1) | Quantrill (5–7) | — | Fenway Park | 32,644 | 65–55 | L1 |
| 121 | August 20 | Indians | 6–7 | Dipoto (4–2) | Russell (0–4) | — | Fenway Park | 31,819 | 65–56 | L2 |
| 122 | August 21 | Indians | 5–10 | Wertz (2–1) | Harris (6–4) | — | Fenway Park | 32,888 | 65–57 | L3 |
| 123 | August 22 | Indians | 2–3 (11) | Kramer (6–3) | Ryan (4–1) | Dipoto (3) | Fenway Park | 33,560 | 65–58 | L4 |
| 124 | August 24 | @ Rangers | 3–4 | Pavlik (8–6) | Darwin (13–9) | Henke (30) | Arlington Stadium | 19,465 | 65–59 | L5 |
| 125 | August 25 | @ Rangers | 2–10 | Dreyer (2–1) | Quantrill (5–8) | — | Arlington Stadium | 18,381 | 65–60 | L6 |
| 126 | August 26 | @ Rangers | 3–1 | Viola (9–8) | Brown (10–10) | Russell (33) | Arlington Stadium | 21,017 | 66–60 | W1 |
| 127 | August 27 | @ Royals | 5–0 | Clemens (10–10) | Haney (9–6) | — | Kauffman Stadium | 24,928 | 67–60 | W2 |
| 128 | August 28 | @ Royals | 2–1 (11) | Russell (1–4) | Montgomery (3–5) | — | Kauffman Stadium | 25,638 | 68–60 | W3 |
| 129 | August 29 | @ Royals | 4–5 (12) | Gubicza (4–6) | Dopson (7–9) | — | Kauffman Stadium | 23,396 | 68–61 | L1 |
| 130 | August 30 | Rangers | 7–3 | Viola (10–8) | Brown (10–11) | — | Fenway Park | 32,781 | 69–61 | W1 |
| 131 | August 31 | Rangers | 1–8 | Rogers (14–7) | Clemens (10–11) | — | Fenway Park | 30,455 | 69–62 | L1 |

September / October: 11–20

| # | Date | Opponent | Score | Win | Loss | Save | Stadium | Attendance | Record | Streak |
|---|---|---|---|---|---|---|---|---|---|---|
| 132 | September 1 | Rangers | 7–9 (12) | Bronkey (1–1) | Quantrill (5–9) | — | Fenway Park | 27,396 | 69–63 | L2 |
| 133 | September 3 | Royals | 1–5 | Appier (15–6) | Darwin (13–10) | — | Fenway Park | 28,323 | 69–64 | L3 |
| 134 | September 4 | Royals | 2–4 | Cone (11–11) | Ryan (4–2) | Montgomery (42) | Fenway Park | 31,223 | 69–65 | L4 |
| 135 | September 5 | Royals | 2–5 | Gordon (9–6) | Clemens (10–12) | — | Fenway Park | 32,012 | 69–66 | L5 |
| 136 | September 6 | @ White Sox | 3–1 | Bankhead (2–1) | McDowell (21–8) | Harris (5) | Comiskey Park | 40,475 | 70–66 | W1 |
| 137 | September 7 | @ White Sox | 4–3 | Darwin (14–10) | Belcher (12–10) | Ryan (1) | Comiskey Park | 27,966 | 71–66 | W2 |
| 138 | September 8 | @ White Sox | 1–8 | Bere (8–5) | Dopson (7–10) | — | Comiskey Park | 36,433 | 71–67 | L1 |
| 139 | September 10 (1) | @ Indians | 4–7 | Ojeda (2–1) | Clemens (10–13) | Dipoto (7) | Cleveland Stadium | — | 71–68 | L2 |
| 140 | September 10 (2) | @ Indians | 5–4 (11) | Ryan (5–2) | Wertz (2–3) | — | Cleveland Stadium | 36,261 | 72–68 | W1 |
| 141 | September 11 | @ Indians | 3–9 | Lilliquist (4–3) | Quantrill (5–10) | — | Cleveland Stadium | 28,788 | 72–69 | L1 |
| 142 | September 12 | @ Indians | 11–1 | Minchey (1–0) | Grimsley (1–4) | — | Cleveland Stadium | 30,170 | 73–69 | W1 |
| 143 | September 13 | Orioles | 6–4 | Quantrill (6–10) | Williamson (7–5) | Harris (6) | Fenway Park | 29,342 | 74–69 | W2 |
| 144 | September 14 | Orioles | 3–11 | Valenzuela (7–9) | Darwin (14–11) | — | Fenway Park | 26,367 | 74–70 | L1 |
| 145 | September 15 | Orioles | 6–5 | Clemens (11–13) | Mussina (14–6) | Harris (7) | Fenway Park | 27,545 | 75–70 | W1 |
| 146 | September 16 | @ Yankees | 6–4 | Viola (11–8) | Kamieniecki (9–6) | Harris (8) | Yankee Stadium | 38,704 | 76–70 | W2 |
| 147 | September 17 | @ Yankees | 4–5 | Gibson (3–1) | Dopson (7–11) | Smith (45) | Yankee Stadium | 48,051 | 76–71 | L1 |
| 148 | September 18 | @ Yankees | 4–2 | Wickman (13–4) | Harris (6–5) | — | Yankee Stadium | 55,672 | 76–72 | L2 |
| 149 | September 19 | @ Yankees | 8–3 | Darwin (15–11) | Tanana (7–16) | — | Yankee Stadium | 53,510 | 77–72 | W1 |
| 150 | September 21 | @ Blue Jays | 0–5 | Stottlemyre (11–10) | Clemens (11–14) | — | SkyDome | 50,524 | 77–73 | L1 |
| 151 | September 22 | @ Blue Jays | 7–5 (10) | Ryan (6–2) | Timlin (4–2) | — | SkyDome | 50,532 | 78–73 | W1 |
| 152 | September 23 | @ Blue Jays | 1–5 | Stewart (11–8) | Minchey (1–1) | — | SkyDome | 50,528 | 78–74 | L1 |
| 153 | September 24 | Twins | 7–4 | Ryan (7–2) | Merriman (1–1) | — | Fenway Park | 27,571 | 79–74 | W1 |
| 154 | September 25 | Twins | 7–9 (10) | Aguilera (3–3) | Harris (6–6) | Willis (5) | Fenway Park | 33,020 | 79–75 | L1 |
| 155 | September 26 | Twins | 2–5 | Trombley (6–5) | Quantrill (6–11) | Aguilera (33) | Fenway Park | 29,097 | 79–76 | L2 |
| — | September 27 | Tigers | Postponed (rain). Makeup date September 28. | | | | | | | |
| 156 | September 28 (1) | Tigers | 11–6 | Sele (7–2) | Krueger (5–4) | — | Fenway Park | — | 80–76 | W1 |
| 157 | September 28 (2) | Tigers | 6–7 (11) | Henneman (5–3) | Fossas (1–1) | Knudsen (2) | Fenway Park | 24,446 | 80–77 | L1 |
| 158 | September 29 | Tigers | 7–8 | Boever (6–2) | Bailey (0–1) | Henneman (23) | Fenway Park | 20,926 | 80–78 | L2 |
| 159 | September 30 | Tigers | 7–8 | Knudsen (3–2) | Taylor (0–1) | Boever (3) | Fenway Park | 22,822 | 80–79 | L3 |
| 160 | October 1 | @ Brewers | 4–8 | Navarro (11–12) | Harris (6–7) | — | Milwaukee County Stadium | 22,138 | 80–80 | L4 |
| 161 | October 2 | @ Brewers | 5–8 | Bones (11–11) | Minchey (1–2) | Kiefer (1) | Milwaukee County Stadium | 28,521 | 80–81 | L5 |
| 162 | October 3 | @ Brewers | 3–6 (14) | Maldonado (2–2) | Quantrill (6–12) | — | Milwaukee County Stadium | 28,131 | 80–82 | L6 |
