= 1993 Oakland Athletics season =

1993 Oakland Athletics
- League: American League
- Division: West
- Ballpark: Oakland–Alameda County Coliseum
- City: Oakland, California
- Record: 68–94 (.420)
- Divisional place: 7th
- Owners: Walter A. Haas, Jr.
- General managers: Sandy Alderson
- Managers: Tony La Russa
- Television: KRON-TV (Dick Stockton, Ray Fosse); Sports Channel Pacific (Ray Fosse, Greg Papa)
- Radio: KNEW (AM) (Bill King, Lon Simmons, Ray Fosse)

The Oakland Athletics' 1993 season was the team's 26th in Oakland, California. It was also the 93rd season in franchise history. The team finished seventh and last in the American League West with a record of 68–94.

The Athletics' disastrous 1993 campaign was mired by inconsistency, injuries, and free agent departures. The team lost key contributors Dave Stewart, Harold Baines, and Mike Moore to free agency; the players ended up (respectively) in Toronto, Baltimore, and Detroit. The A's also traded Walt Weiss to the expansion Florida Marlins for Scott Baker and Eric Helfand. The Athletics' roster was further weakened by the retirement of longtime third baseman Carney Lansford.

The team's depleted pitching staff was no match for its American League (AL) competition. The Athletics, following a resurgent 1992 campaign, finished 1993 with a team ERA of 4.90; this was the worst such figure in the AL. The futility of Oakland's new-look starting rotation was especially noteworthy; of the team's five primary starters (Bobby Witt, Ron Darling, Bob Welch, Todd Van Poppel, and Shawn Hillegas), only one (Witt) managed a sub-5.00 ERA. On offense, the Athletics also struggled; the loss of their two best players (Mark McGwire and Rickey Henderson) to injury and a trade, respectively, contributed to their scoring only 715 runs (10th of 14 AL teams).

The Athletics' 68-94 finish was their worst since 1982. Moreover, the 1993 Athletics were only team in Oakland history to finish last in the AL West after finishing first one-year earlier.

== Offseason ==
- October 27, 1992: Jamie Quirk was released by the Athletics.
- November 17, 1992: Walt Weiss was traded by the Athletics to the Florida Marlins for Eric Helfand and a player to be named later. The Marlins completed the deal by sending Scott Baker to the Athletics on November 20.
- December 7, 1992: Rich Gossage was signed as a free agent by the Athletics.
- December 17, 1992: Ron Darling was signed as a free agent by the Athletics.
- January 21, 1993: Joe Boever was signed as a free agent by the Athletics.
- January 21, 1993: Dale Sveum was signed as a free agent by the Athletics.
- March 27, 1993: Mike Aldrete was signed as a free agent by the Athletics.

== Regular season ==
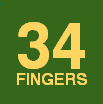
Rollie
Fingers
Pitcher:
1968-76(OAK)

Retired 1993

=== Season standings ===
AL West
Team	W	L	Pct.	GB	Home	Road
Chicago White Sox	94	68	.580	—	45‍–‍36	49‍–‍32
Texas Rangers	86	76	.531	8	50‍–‍31	36‍–‍45
Kansas City Royals	84	78	.519	10	43‍–‍38	41‍–‍40
Seattle Mariners	82	80	.506	12	46‍–‍35	36‍–‍45
California Angels	71	91	.438	23	44‍–‍37	27‍–‍54
Minnesota Twins	71	91	.438	23	36‍–‍45	35‍–‍46
Oakland Athletics	68	94	.420	26	38‍–‍43	30‍–‍51

=== Record vs. opponents ===
1993 American League record Source: MLB Standings Grid – 1993
Team	BAL	BOS	CAL	CWS	CLE	DET	KC	MIL	MIN	NYY	OAK	SEA	TEX	TOR
Baltimore	—	6–7	7–5	4–8	8–5	5–8	7–5	8–5	8–4	6–7	10–2	7–5	4–8	5–8
Boston	7–6	—	7–5	7–5	5–8	6–7	5–7	5–8	7–5	6–7	9–3	7–5	6–6	3–10
California	5–7	5–7	—	7–6	5–7	4–8	6–7	7–5	4–9	6–6	6–7	6–7	6–7	4–8
Chicago	8–4	5–7	6–7	—	9–3	7–5	6–7	9–3	10–3	4–8	7–6	9–4	8–5	6–6
Cleveland	5–8	8–5	7–5	3–9	—	6–7	7–5	8–5	4–8	6–7	8–4	3–9	7–5	4–9
Detroit	8–5	7–6	8–4	5–7	7–6	—	5–7	8–5	6–6	4–9	8–4	7–5	6–6	6–7
Kansas City	5–7	7–5	7–6	7–6	5–7	7–5	—	5–7	7–6	6–6	6–7	7–6	7–6	8–4
Milwaukee	5–8	8–5	5–7	3–9	5–8	5–8	7–5	—	7–5	4–9	7–5	4–8	4–8	5–8
Minnesota	4–8	5–7	9–4	3–10	8–4	6–6	6–7	5–7	—	4–8	8–5	4–9	7–6	2–10
New York	7–6	7–6	6–6	8–4	7–6	9–4	6–6	9–4	8–4	—	6–6	7–5	3–9	5–8
Oakland	2–10	3–9	7–6	6–7	4–8	4–8	7–6	5–7	5–8	6–6	—	9–4	5–8	5–7
Seattle	5–7	5–7	7–6	4–9	9–3	5–7	6–7	8–4	9–4	5–7	4–9	—	8–5	7–5
Texas	8–4	6–6	7–6	5–8	5–7	6–6	6–7	8–4	6–7	9–3	8–5	5–8	—	7–5
Toronto	8–5	10–3	8–4	6–6	9–4	7–6	4–8	8–5	10–2	8–5	7–5	5–7	5–7	—

=== Notable transactions ===
- June 3, 1993: 1993 Major League Baseball draft
  - Jeff D'Amico was drafted by the Athletics in the 2nd round.
  - Jason McDonald was drafted by the Athletics in the 4th round. Player signed July 27, 1993.
  - Scott Spiezio was drafted by the Athletics in the 6th round. Player signed June 24, 1993.
- June 17, 1993: Dale Sveum was released by the Athletics.
- July 17, 1993: Miguel Tejada was signed by the Athletics as an amateur free agent.
- July 31, 1993: Rickey Henderson was traded by the Athletics to the Toronto Blue Jays for Steve Karsay and a player to be named later. The Blue Jays completed the deal by sending José Herrera to the Athletics on August 6.
- August 15, 1993: Joe Boever was released by the Athletics.

=== Roster ===
1993 Oakland Athletics
Roster
Pitchers: 46 Joe Boever; 53 John Briscoe; 55 Kevin Campbell; 17 Ron Darling; 15 Storm Davis; 31 Kelly Downs; 43 Dennis Eckersley; 54 Goose Gossage; 57 Shawn Hillegas; 40 Rick Honeycutt; 26 Vince Horsman; 47 Miguel Jimenez; 50 Steve Karsay; 58 Mike Mohler; 52 Edwin Núñez; 37 Joe Slusarski; 51 Roger Smithberg; 59 Todd Van Poppel; 35 Bob Welch; 32 Bobby Witt; 29 Curt Young	Catchers: 48 Eric Helfand; 2 Scott Hemond; 39 Henry Mercedes; 36 Terry Steinbach; Infielders: 23 Mike Aldrete; 38 Marcos Armas; 14 Mike Bordick; 13 Brent Gates; 25 Mark McGwire; 16 Troy Neel; 3 Craig Paquette; 20 Kevin Seitzer; 6 Dale Sveum	Outfielders: 11 Kurt Abbott; 12 Lance Blankenship; 7 Scott Brosius; 30 Jerry Browne; 28 Eric Fox; 42 Dave Henderson; 24 Rickey Henderson; 49 Scott Lydy; 29 Rubén Sierra	Manager: 10 Tony La Russa; Coaches: 18 Dave Duncan; 5 Art Kusnyer; 19 Greg Luzinski; 8 Dave McKay; 47 Tommie Reynolds

== Player stats ==
=== Batting ===
==== Starters by position ====
Note: Pos = Position; G = Games played; AB = At bats; H = Hits; Avg. = Batting average; HR = Home runs; RBI = Runs batted in

Pos	Player	G	AB	H	Avg.	HR	RBI
C	Terry Steinbach	104	389	111	.285	10	43
1B	Mike Aldrete	95	255	68	.267	10	33
2B	Brent Gates	139	535	155	.290	7	69
3B	Craig Paquette	105	393	86	.219	12	46
SS	Mike Bordick	159	546	136	.249	3	48
LF	Rickey Henderson	90	318	104	.327	17	47
CF	Dave Henderson	107	382	84	.220	20	53
RF	Rubén Sierra	158	630	147	.233	22	101
DH	Troy Neel	123	427	124	.290	19	63

==== Other batters ====
Note: G = Games played; AB = At bats; H = Hits; Avg. = Batting average; HR = Home runs; RBI = Runs batted in

Player	G	AB	H	Avg.	HR	RBI
Jerry Browne	76	260	65	.250	2	19
Kevin Seitzer	73	255	65	.255	4	27
Lance Blankenship	94	252	48	.190	2	23
Scott Hemond	91	215	55	.256	6	26
Scott Brosius	70	213	53	.249	6	25
Scott Lydy	41	102	23	.225	2	7
Mark McGwire	27	84	28	.333	9	24
Dale Sveum	30	79	14	.177	2	6
Kurt Abbott	20	61	15	.246	3	9
Eric Fox	29	56	8	.143	1	5
Henry Mercedes	20	47	10	.213	0	3
Marcos Armas	15	31	6	.194	1	1
Eric Helfand	8	13	3	.231	0	1

=== Pitching ===
==== Starting pitchers ====
Note: G = Games pitched; IP = Innings pitched; W = Wins; L = Losses; ERA = Earned run average; SO = Strikeouts

Player	G	IP	W	L	ERA	SO
Bobby Witt	35	220.0	14	13	4.21	131
Ron Darling	31	178.0	5	9	5.16	95
Bob Welch	30	166.2	9	11	5.29	63
Todd Van Poppel	16	84.0	6	6	5.04	47
Steve Karsay	8	49.0	3	3	4.04	33
Miguel Jimenez	5	27.0	1	0	4.00	13
Curt Young	3	14.2	1	1	4.30	4

==== Other pitchers ====
Note: G = Games pitched; IP = Innings pitched; W = Wins; L = Losses; ERA = Earned run average; SO = Strikeouts

Player	G	IP	W	L	ERA	SO
Kelly Downs	42	119.2	5	10	5.64	66
Mike Mohler	42	64.1	1	6	5.60	42
Storm Davis	19	62.2	2	6	6.18	37
Shawn Hillegas	18	60.2	3	6	6.97	29
Joe Slusarski	2	8.2	0	0	5.19	1

==== Relief pitchers ====
Note: G = Games pitched; W = Wins; L = Losses; SV = Saves; ERA = Earned run average; SO = Strikeouts

Player	G	W	L	SV	ERA	SO
Dennis Eckersley	64	2	4	36	4.16	80
Edwin Núñez	56	3	6	1	3.81	58
Rick Honeycutt	52	1	4	1	2.81	21
Joe Boever	42	4	2	0	3.86	49
Vince Horsman	40	2	0	0	5.40	17
Rich Gossage	39	4	5	1	4.53	40
John Briscoe	17	1	0	0	8.03	24
Roger Smithberg	13	1	2	3	2.75	4
Kevin Campbell	11	0	0	0	7.31	9
Kevin Seitzer	1	0	0	0	0.00	1

== Farm system ==
Level	Team	League	Manager
AAA	Tacoma Tigers	Pacific Coast League	Bob Boone
AA	Huntsville Stars	Southern League	Casey Parsons
A	Modesto A's	California League	Ted Kubiak
A	Madison Muskies	Midwest League	Gary Jones
A-Short Season	Southern Oregon A's	Northwest League	Dick Scott
Rookie	AZL Athletics	Arizona League	Bruce Hines

LEAGUE CHAMPIONS: AZL Athletics
