= Jeff McNeely =

American baseball player (born 1969)

- Outfielder
- Born: October 18, 1969 (age 56); Monroe, North Carolina, U.S.
- Batted: Right Threw: Right

MLB debut
- September 5, 1993, for the Boston Red Sox

Last MLB appearance
- October 3, 1993, for the Boston Red Sox

MLB statistics
- Games played: 21
- Batting average: .297
- Runs scored: 10
- Stats at Baseball Reference

Teams
- Boston Red Sox (1993)

Jeffrey Lavern McNeely (born October 18, 1969) is an American former center fielder/designated hitter in Major League Baseball who played briefly for the Boston Red Sox during the 1993 season. Listed at 6' 2", 190 lb., McNeely batted and threw right-handed. He attended Spartanburg Methodist College.

In a season/career, McNeely was a .297 hitter (11-for-37) with 10 runs and six stolen bases in 21 games, including one double, one triple, one RBI, a .409 on-base percentage without home runs. In 13 outfield appearances, he collected a .917 fielding percentage (two errors in 24 chances).

From 1992 to 1996, McNeely also played in the minors with New Britain (1992), Pawtucket (1993–94), Louisville (1995–96). In 479 games, he hit .239 with eight home runs, 197 runs, 118 RBI, and 70 stolen bases.

McNeely runs Charlotte Megastars Baseball Club. He helped over 350 players receive a baseball scholarship.

McNeely currently runs security and suspension at South Mecklenburg High School in Charlotte NC.

== Transactions ==
- 1989: Selected by the Boston Red Sox in the 2nd round of the 1989 draft.
- 1994: Traded by Boston along with Nate Minchey to the St. Louis Cardinals in exchange for Luis Alicea.

== See also ==
- Boston Red Sox all-time roster
- 1993 Boston Red Sox season
