= 1993 Milwaukee Brewers season =

1993 Milwaukee Brewers
- League: American League
- Division: East
- Ballpark: Milwaukee County Stadium
- City: Milwaukee, Wisconsin, United States
- Record: 69–93 (.426)
- Divisional place: 7th
- Owners: Bud Selig
- General managers: Sal Bando
- Managers: Phil Garner
- Television: WVTV (Rory Markas, Del Crandall)
- Radio: WTMJ (AM) (Bob Uecker, Pat Hughes)

The 1993 Milwaukee Brewers season was the 24th season for the Brewers in Milwaukee, and their 25th overall. The Brewers finished seventh in the American League East with a record of 69 wins and 93 losses.

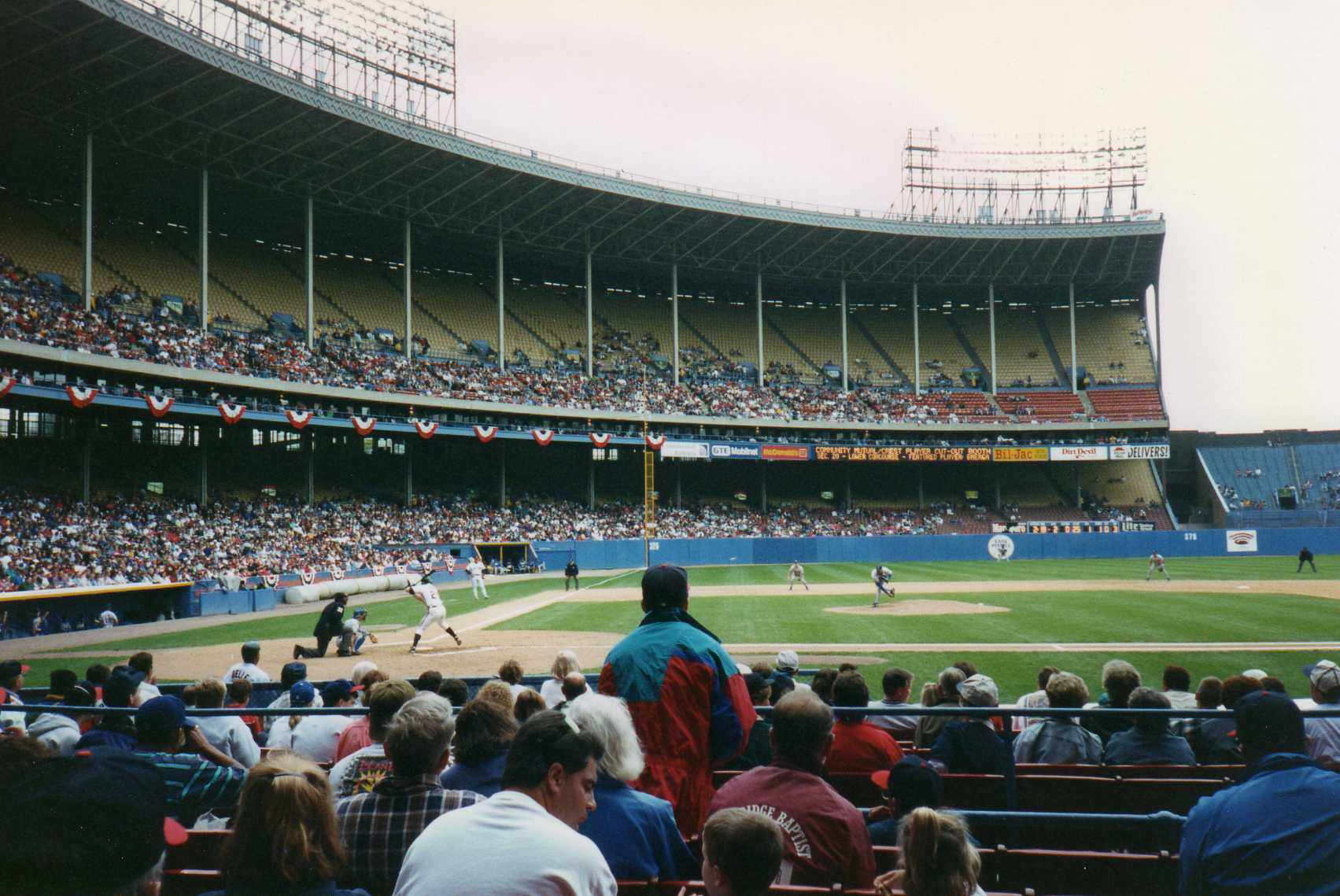
The Brewers playing against the Cleveland Indians during a 1993 away game at Cleveland Municipal Stadium.

== Offseason ==
- November 17, 1992: Dante Bichette was traded by the Brewers to the Colorado Rockies for Kevin Reimer.
- November 20, 1992: Josías Manzanillo was signed as a free agent by the Brewers.
- January 13, 1993: Bill Doran was purchased by the Milwaukee Brewers from the Cincinnati Reds.

== Regular season ==
=== Season standings ===
AL East
Team	W	L	Pct.	GB	Home	Road
Toronto Blue Jays	95	67	.586	—	48‍–‍33	47‍–‍34
New York Yankees	88	74	.543	7	50‍–‍31	38‍–‍43
Baltimore Orioles	85	77	.525	10	48‍–‍33	37‍–‍44
Detroit Tigers	85	77	.525	10	44‍–‍37	41‍–‍40
Boston Red Sox	80	82	.494	15	43‍–‍38	37‍–‍44
Cleveland Indians	76	86	.469	19	46‍–‍35	30‍–‍51
Milwaukee Brewers	69	93	.426	26	38‍–‍43	31‍–‍50

=== Record vs. opponents ===
1993 American League record Source: MLB Standings Grid – 1993
Team	BAL	BOS	CAL	CWS	CLE	DET	KC	MIL	MIN	NYY	OAK	SEA	TEX	TOR
Baltimore	—	6–7	7–5	4–8	8–5	5–8	7–5	8–5	8–4	6–7	10–2	7–5	4–8	5–8
Boston	7–6	—	7–5	7–5	5–8	6–7	5–7	5–8	7–5	6–7	9–3	7–5	6–6	3–10
California	5–7	5–7	—	7–6	5–7	4–8	6–7	7–5	4–9	6–6	6–7	6–7	6–7	4–8
Chicago	8–4	5–7	6–7	—	9–3	7–5	6–7	9–3	10–3	4–8	7–6	9–4	8–5	6–6
Cleveland	5–8	8–5	7–5	3–9	—	6–7	7–5	8–5	4–8	6–7	8–4	3–9	7–5	4–9
Detroit	8–5	7–6	8–4	5–7	7–6	—	5–7	8–5	6–6	4–9	8–4	7–5	6–6	6–7
Kansas City	5–7	7–5	7–6	7–6	5–7	7–5	—	5–7	7–6	6–6	6–7	7–6	7–6	8–4
Milwaukee	5–8	8–5	5–7	3–9	5–8	5–8	7–5	—	7–5	4–9	7–5	4–8	4–8	5–8
Minnesota	4–8	5–7	9–4	3–10	8–4	6–6	6–7	5–7	—	4–8	8–5	4–9	7–6	2–10
New York	7–6	7–6	6–6	8–4	7–6	9–4	6–6	9–4	8–4	—	6–6	7–5	3–9	5–8
Oakland	2–10	3–9	7–6	6–7	4–8	4–8	7–6	5–7	5–8	6–6	—	9–4	5–8	5–7
Seattle	5–7	5–7	7–6	4–9	9–3	5–7	6–7	8–4	9–4	5–7	4–9	—	8–5	7–5
Texas	8–4	6–6	7–6	5–8	5–7	6–6	6–7	8–4	6–7	9–3	8–5	5–8	—	7–5
Toronto	8–5	10–3	8–4	6–6	9–4	7–6	4–8	8–5	10–2	8–5	7–5	5–7	5–7	—

=== Transactions ===
- April 14, 1993: Tim McIntosh was selected off waivers from the Brewers by the Montreal Expos.
- April 26, 1993: Mike Boddicker was purchased by the Brewers from the Kansas City Royals.
- June 1, 1993: Juan Bell was selected off waivers by the Brewers from the Philadelphia Phillies.
- June 5, 1993: Dane Johnson was signed as a free agent by the Brewers.
- June 12, 1993: Josías Manzanillo was traded by the Milwaukee Brewers to the New York Mets for Wayne Housie.

==== Draft picks ====
- June 3, 1993: Jeff D'Amico was drafted by the Brewers in the 1st round (23rd pick) of the 1993 Major League Baseball draft. Player signed August 25, 1993.

=== Roster ===
1993 Milwaukee Brewers
Roster
Pitchers: 42 Jim Austin; 52 Mike Boddicker; 25 Ricky Bones; 21 Cal Eldred; 36 Mike Fetters; 28 Doug Henry; 49 Teddy Higuera; 40 Mike Ignasiak; 43 Mark Kiefer; 37 Graeme Lloyd; 48,52 Carlos Maldonado; 51 Josías Manzanillo; 50 Matt Maysey; 38 Ángel Miranda; 31 Jaime Navarro; 39 Rafael Novoa; 47 Jesse Orosco; 46 Bill Wegman	Catchers: 27 Joe Kmak; 22 Tom Lampkin; 26 Tim McIntosh; 11 Dave Nilsson; Infielders: 26 Juan Bell; 13 Bill Doran; 32 John Jaha; 16 Pat Listach; 20 Kevin Seitzer; 9 Bill Spiers; 2 William Suero; 5 B. J. Surhoff; 8 Dickie Thon; 2 José Valentín	Outfielders: 18 Tom Brunansky; 1 Alex Diaz; 24 Darryl Hamilton; 30 Matt Mieske; 33 Troy O'Leary; 29 Kevin Reimer; 23 Greg Vaughn; 19 Robin Yount	Manager: 3 Phil Garner; Coaches: 35 Bill Castro (Bullpen); 12 Gene Clines (Hitting); 10 Duffy Dyer (Third Base); 14 Tim Foli (First Base); 45 Don Rowe (Pitching)

== Player stats ==
=== Batting ===
==== Starters by position ====
Note: Pos = Position; G = Games played; AB = At bats; H = Hits; Avg. = Batting average; HR = Home runs; RBI = Runs batted in

Pos	Player	G	AB	H	Avg.	HR	RBI
C	Dave Nilsson	100	296	76	.257	7	40
1B	John Jaha	153	515	136	.264	19	70
2B	Bill Spiers	113	340	81	.238	2	36
SS	Pat Listach	98	356	87	.244	3	30
3B	B.J. Surhoff	148	552	151	.274	7	79
LF	Greg Vaughn	154	569	152	.267	30	97
CF	Robin Yount	127	454	117	.258	8	51
RF	Darryl Hamilton	135	520	161	.310	9	48
DH	Kevin Reimer	125	437	109	.249	13	60

==== Other batters ====
Note: G = Games played; AB = At bats; H = Hits; Avg. = Batting average; HR = Home runs; RBI = Runs batted in

Player	G	AB	H	Avg.	HR	RBI
Juan Bell	91	286	67	.234	5	29
Dickie Thon	85	245	66	.269	1	33
Tom Brunansky	80	224	41	.183	6	29
Tom Lampkin	73	162	32	.198	4	25
Kevin Seitzer	47	162	47	.290	7	30
Joe Kmak	51	110	24	.218	0	7
Alex Diaz	32	69	22	.319	0	1
Bill Doran	28	60	13	.217	0	6
Matt Mieske	23	58	14	.241	3	7
José Valentín	19	53	13	.245	1	7
Troy O'Leary	19	41	12	.293	0	3
William Suero	15	14	4	.286	0	0
Tim McIntosh	1	0	0	----	0	0

=== Pitching ===
==== Starting pitchers ====
Note: G = Games pitched; IP = Innings pitched; W = Wins; L = Losses; ERA = Earned run average; SO = Strikeouts

Player	G	IP	W	L	ERA	SO
Cal Eldred	36	258.0	16	16	4.01	180
Jaime Navarro	35	214.1	11	12	5.33	114
Ricky Bones	32	203.2	11	11	4.86	63
Bill Wegman	20	120.2	4	14	4.48	50
Ángel Miranda	22	120.0	4	5	3.30	88
Mike Boddicker	10	54.0	3	5	5.67	24
Teddy Higuera	8	30.0	1	3	7.20	27

==== Other pitchers ====
Note: G = Games pitched; IP = Innings pitched; W = Wins; L = Losses; ERA = Earned run average; SO = Strikeouts

Player	G	IP	W	L	ERA	SO
Rafael Novoa	15	56.0	0	3	4.50	17

==== Relief pitchers ====
Note: G = Games pitched; W = Wins; L = Losses; SV = Saves; ERA = Earned run average; SO = Strikeouts

Player	G	W	L	SV	ERA	SO
Doug Henry	54	4	4	17	5.56	38
Jesse Orosco	57	3	5	8	3.18	67
Graeme Lloyd	55	3	4	0	2.83	31
Mike Fetters	45	3	3	0	3.34	23
Jim Austin	31	1	2	0	3.82	15
Carlos Maldonado	29	2	2	1	4.58	18
Mike Ignasiak	27	1	1	0	3.65	28
Matt Maysey	23	1	2	1	5.73	10
Josías Manzanillo	10	1	1	1	9.53	10
Mark Kiefer	6	0	0	1	0.00	7

== Farm system ==
The Brewers' farm system consisted of seven minor league affiliates in 1993.

Level	Team	League	Manager
Triple-A	New Orleans Zephyrs	American Association	Chris Bando
Double-A	El Paso Diablos	Texas League	Tim Ireland
Class A-Advanced	Stockton Ports	California League	Lamar Johnson
Class A	Beloit Brewers	Midwest League	Wayne Krenchicki
Rookie	Helena Brewers	Pioneer League	Mike Epstein and Harry Dunlop
Rookie	AZL Brewers	Arizona League	Ralph Dickenson
Rookie	DSL Brewers	Dominican Summer League	—
