= 1993 Detroit Tigers season =

Major League Baseball season

1993 Detroit Tigers
- League: American League
- Division: East
- Ballpark: Tiger Stadium
- City: Detroit, Michigan
- Record: 85–77
- Divisional place: 4th
- Owners: Mike Ilitch
- General managers: Jerry Walker
- Managers: Sparky Anderson
- Television: WDIV-TV (George Kell, Al Kaline); PASS (Jim Price, Jim Northrup)
- Radio: WJR (Rick Rizzs, Bob Rathbun, Ernie Harwell)

The 1993 Detroit Tigers season was the team's 93rd season and the 82nd season at Tiger Stadium. The team wasn't expected to do much after a sixth-place finish the previous season. The pitching staff was riddled with inconsistencies, but the Tigers were in first place as late as June 25 before a 10-game losing streak ended their hopes of a turnaround. This would be the Tigers last winning season of the 20th century; the next time the team finished with a winning record was 2006, which by then the team had been playing in Comerica Park for 7 years.

== Overview ==
At the heart of the team were three stars left over from the championship team of 1984: 36-year-old second baseman Lou Whitaker, 36-year-old outfielder Kirk Gibson (who had returned to Detroit during the 1992 offseason), and 35-year-old shortstop Alan Trammell. There was also the All-Star slugger Cecil Fielder at first base who, true to form, clubbed 30 home runs and drove in a team-high 117 RBIs; promising young shortstop Travis Fryman batted an even .300 and paced the team with 182 hits; and catcher Chad Kreuter enjoyed the best season of his career, setting career-highs in homers (15), average (.286) and runs batted in (51).

Tony Phillips, a versatile switch hitter, could play just about anywhere in the field and even DH, but he mostly ended up in the outfield. A patient leadoff man, Phillips set the table for the Tigers' offense. He got on base any way he could, with a base hit, drawing a walk or getting hit by a pitch more than 300 times; thus, he scored 113 runs while hitting for a .313 average. Mickey Tettleton was equally flexible. He caught, played first, and also saw duty in the outfield and at DH when needed. With power from both sides of the plate, Tettleton did serious damage, hitting 32 homers, driving in 110 runs, and drawing 109 walks.

Though the team may often be overlooked in the long, storied history of the Tigers' franchise (perhaps due to being in the midst of the team's leanest years), they were as powerful a lineup as the Tigers had ever seen, and for several weeks they lit up the American League, scoring runs at an eye-popping rate. With a lineup built around patience and swing-for-the-fences power, the Tigers got off to a remarkable start in tallying runs. In their home opener, they pummeled the Oakland Athletics by the score of 20–4. In that game Fryman had five RBIs, Tettleton plated four, and Fielder went 4-for-4 as the Tigers pounded out 18 hits and drew twelve walks. Four days later against the Mariners, the Tigers won 20–3, this time behind 20 hits and ten more walks. The next day Detroit won, 8–7. But that was just the beginning. When the club went on the road to face the Twins for a three-game series in late April, Detroit pounded their way to victories by the scores of 12–4, 17–1, and 16–5. In the series, Detroit finished with 46 hits and drew 22 walks while hitting 11 homers and 23 extra-base hits.

On April 23, the Tigers were in first place and they would stay there for two months. Over the first six weeks of the season, the vaunted Tiger lineup was averaging 8 1/2 runs per game, on pace to score more than 1,300 runs. This would have shattered the modern-day record held by the 1894 Baltimore Orioles, who scored 1,171 runs.

On June 20, the Tigers beat the Milwaukee Brewers 7–3, putting them at 43–25, good for first in the East with a two-game lead over second-place and defending World Champion Toronto. However, the team immediately went on a 10-game losing streak, during which they were outscored 80–31. The Tigers never recovered and finished in a tie for third place in the American League East with Baltimore.

Even with their success, the pitching continued to struggle, as evidenced by numerous high-scoring affairs against other top-tier teams such as the Toronto Blue Jays and the New York Yankees.

The Tigers lead the American League in runs scored (899), walks (765), on-base percentage (.362), and on base-plus slugging (.796).

The 85 victories were the most by the team in five years and would also mark the Tigers' last winning season until 2006.

== Offseason ==
- December 7, 1992: Bill Gullickson was signed as a free agent by the Tigers.
- February 10, 1993: Kirk Gibson was signed as a free agent with the Detroit Tigers.
- Before 1993 Season: Steve Carter was sent from the Detroit Tigers to the Cincinnati Reds.

== Regular season ==
=== Season standings ===
AL East
| Team | W | L | Pct. | GB | Home | Road |
|---|---|---|---|---|---|---|
| Toronto Blue Jays | 95 | 67 | .586 | — | 48‍–‍33 | 47‍–‍34 |
| New York Yankees | 88 | 74 | .543 | 7 | 50‍–‍31 | 38‍–‍43 |
| Baltimore Orioles | 85 | 77 | .525 | 10 | 48‍–‍33 | 37‍–‍44 |
| Detroit Tigers | 85 | 77 | .525 | 10 | 44‍–‍37 | 41‍–‍40 |
| Boston Red Sox | 80 | 82 | .494 | 15 | 43‍–‍38 | 37‍–‍44 |
| Cleveland Indians | 76 | 86 | .469 | 19 | 46‍–‍35 | 30‍–‍51 |
| Milwaukee Brewers | 69 | 93 | .426 | 26 | 38‍–‍43 | 31‍–‍50 |

=== Record vs. opponents ===
1993 American League record Source: MLB Standings Grid – 1993
| Team | BAL | BOS | CAL | CWS | CLE | DET | KC | MIL | MIN | NYY | OAK | SEA | TEX | TOR |
|---|---|---|---|---|---|---|---|---|---|---|---|---|---|---|
| Baltimore | — | 6–7 | 7–5 | 4–8 | 8–5 | 5–8 | 7–5 | 8–5 | 8–4 | 6–7 | 10–2 | 7–5 | 4–8 | 5–8 |
| Boston | 7–6 | — | 7–5 | 7–5 | 5–8 | 6–7 | 5–7 | 5–8 | 7–5 | 6–7 | 9–3 | 7–5 | 6–6 | 3–10 |
| California | 5–7 | 5–7 | — | 7–6 | 5–7 | 4–8 | 6–7 | 7–5 | 4–9 | 6–6 | 6–7 | 6–7 | 6–7 | 4–8 |
| Chicago | 8–4 | 5–7 | 6–7 | — | 9–3 | 7–5 | 6–7 | 9–3 | 10–3 | 4–8 | 7–6 | 9–4 | 8–5 | 6–6 |
| Cleveland | 5–8 | 8–5 | 7–5 | 3–9 | — | 6–7 | 7–5 | 8–5 | 4–8 | 6–7 | 8–4 | 3–9 | 7–5 | 4–9 |
| Detroit | 8–5 | 7–6 | 8–4 | 5–7 | 7–6 | — | 5–7 | 8–5 | 6–6 | 4–9 | 8–4 | 7–5 | 6–6 | 6–7 |
| Kansas City | 5–7 | 7–5 | 7–6 | 7–6 | 5–7 | 7–5 | — | 5–7 | 7–6 | 6–6 | 6–7 | 7–6 | 7–6 | 8–4 |
| Milwaukee | 5–8 | 8–5 | 5–7 | 3–9 | 5–8 | 5–8 | 7–5 | — | 7–5 | 4–9 | 7–5 | 4–8 | 4–8 | 5–8 |
| Minnesota | 4–8 | 5–7 | 9–4 | 3–10 | 8–4 | 6–6 | 6–7 | 5–7 | — | 4–8 | 8–5 | 4–9 | 7–6 | 2–10 |
| New York | 7–6 | 7–6 | 6–6 | 8–4 | 7–6 | 9–4 | 6–6 | 9–4 | 8–4 | — | 6–6 | 7–5 | 3–9 | 5–8 |
| Oakland | 2–10 | 3–9 | 7–6 | 6–7 | 4–8 | 4–8 | 7–6 | 5–7 | 5–8 | 6–6 | — | 9–4 | 5–8 | 5–7 |
| Seattle | 5–7 | 5–7 | 7–6 | 4–9 | 9–3 | 5–7 | 6–7 | 8–4 | 9–4 | 5–7 | 4–9 | — | 8–5 | 7–5 |
| Texas | 8–4 | 6–6 | 7–6 | 5–8 | 5–7 | 6–6 | 6–7 | 8–4 | 6–7 | 9–3 | 8–5 | 5–8 | — | 7–5 |
| Toronto | 8–5 | 10–3 | 8–4 | 6–6 | 9–4 | 7–6 | 4–8 | 8–5 | 10–2 | 8–5 | 7–5 | 5–7 | 5–7 | — |

=== Notable transactions ===
- August 21, 1993: Joe Boever was signed as a free agent by the Tigers.
- August 31, 1993: The Tigers traded a player to be named later to the Los Angeles Dodgers for Eric Davis. The Tigers completed the deal by sending John DeSilva to the Dodgers on September 7.

=== Roster ===
1993 Detroit Tigers
Roster
| Pitchers: 43 Sean Bergman; 37 Joe Boever; 49 Tom Bolton; 48 Storm Davis; 41 John DeSilva; 44 John Doherty; 46 Mike Gardiner; 34 Greg Gohr; 37 Mark Grater; 42 Buddy Groom; 36 Bill Gullickson; 18 Dave Haas; 39 Mike Henneman; 40 Dave Johnson; 46 John Kiely; 27 Kurt Knudsen; 30 Bill Krueger; 13 Mark Leiter; 38 Bob MacDonald; 21 Mike Moore; 43 Mike Munoz; 16 David Wells | Catchers: 19 Chad Kreuter; 12 Rich Rowland; Infielders: 9 Skeeter Barnes; 45 Cecil Fielder; 24 Travis Fryman; 35 Chris Gomez; 7 Scott Livingstone; 20 Mickey Tettleton; 3 Alan Trammell; 1 Lou Whitaker | Outfielders: 29 Danny Bautista; 22 Milt Cuyler; 33 Eric Davis; 28 Rob Deer; 23 Kirk Gibson; 32 Dan Gladden; 4 Tony Phillips; 15 Gary Thurman | Manager: 11 Sparky Anderson; Coaches: 50 Billy Consolo (Bench); 54 Larry Herndon (Hitting); 56 Billy Muffett (Pitching); 52 Gene Roof (First Base); 53 Dick Tracewski (Third Base); 59 Dan Whitmer (Bullpen) |

== Player stats ==
| = Indicates team leader |

=== Batting ===
==== Starters by position ====
Note: Pos = Position; G = Games played; AB = At bats; H = Hits; Avg. = Batting average; HR = Home runs; RBI = Runs batted in

| Pos | Player | G | AB | H | Avg. | HR | RBI |
|---|---|---|---|---|---|---|---|
| C | Chad Kreuter | 119 | 374 | 107 | .286 | 15 | 51 |
| 1B | Cecil Fielder | 154 | 573 | 153 | .267 | 30 | 117 |
| 2B | Lou Whitaker | 119 | 383 | 111 | .290 | 9 | 67 |
| SS | Travis Fryman | 151 | 607 | 182 | .300 | 22 | 97 |
| 3B | Scott Livingstone | 98 | 304 | 89 | .293 | 2 | 39 |
| LF | Dan Gladden | 91 | 356 | 95 | .267 | 13 | 56 |
| CF | Milt Cuyler | 82 | 249 | 53 | .213 | 0 | 19 |
| RF | Rob Deer | 90 | 323 | 70 | .217 | 14 | 39 |
| DH | Kirk Gibson | 116 | 403 | 105 | .261 | 13 | 62 |

==== Other batters ====
Note: G = Games played; AB = At bats; H = Hits; Avg. = Batting average; HR = Home runs; RBI = Runs batted in

| Player | G | AB | H | Avg. | HR | RBI |
|---|---|---|---|---|---|---|
| Tony Phillips | 151 | 566 | 177 | .313 | 7 | 57 |
| Mickey Tettleton | 152 | 522 | 128 | .245 | 32 | 110 |
| Alan Trammell | 112 | 401 | 132 | .329 | 12 | 60 |
| Skeeter Barnes | 84 | 160 | 45 | .281 | 2 | 27 |
| Chris Gomez | 46 | 128 | 32 | .250 | 0 | 11 |
| Gary Thurman | 75 | 89 | 19 | .213 | 0 | 13 |
| Eric Davis | 23 | 75 | 19 | .253 | 6 | 15 |
| Danny Bautista | 17 | 61 | 19 | .311 | 1 | 9 |
| Rich Rowland | 21 | 46 | 10 | .217 | 0 | 4 |

=== Pitching ===
==== Starting pitchers ====
Note: G = Games pitched; IP = Innings pitched; W = Wins; L = Losses; ERA = Earned run average; SO = Strikeouts

| Player | G | IP | W | L | ERA | SO |
|---|---|---|---|---|---|---|
| Mike Moore | 36 | 213.2 | 13 | 9 | 5.22 | 89 |
| David Wells | 32 | 187.0 | 11 | 9 | 4.19 | 139 |
| John Doherty | 32 | 184.2 | 14 | 11 | 4.44 | 63 |
| Bill Gullickson | 28 | 159.1 | 13 | 9 | 5.37 | 70 |

==== Other pitchers ====
Note: G = Games pitched; IP = Innings pitched; W = Wins; L = Losses; ERA = Earned run average; SO = Strikeouts

| Player | G | IP | W | L | ERA | SO |
|---|---|---|---|---|---|---|
| Mark Leiter | 27 | 106.2 | 6 | 6 | 4.73 | 70 |
| Tom Bolton | 43 | 102.2 | 6 | 6 | 4.47 | 66 |
| Bill Krueger | 32 | 82.0 | 6 | 4 | 3.40 | 60 |
| Sean Bergman | 9 | 39.2 | 1 | 4 | 5.67 | 19 |

==== Relief pitchers ====
Note: G = Games pitched; W = Wins; L = Losses; SV = Saves; ERA = Earned run average; SO = Strikeouts

| Player | G | W | L | SV | ERA | SO |
|---|---|---|---|---|---|---|
| Mike Henneman | 63 | 5 | 3 | 24 | 2.64 | 58 |
| Bob MacDonald | 68 | 3 | 3 | 3 | 5.35 | 39 |
| Kurt Knudsen | 30 | 3 | 2 | 2 | 4.78 | 29 |
| Storm Davis | 24 | 0 | 2 | 4 | 3.06 | 36 |
| Dave Haas | 20 | 1 | 2 | 0 | 6.11 | 17 |
| Buddy Groom | 19 | 0 | 2 | 0 | 6.14 | 15 |
| Joe Boever | 19 | 2 | 1 | 3 | 2.74 | 14 |
| Greg Gohr | 16 | 0 | 0 | 0 | 5.96 | 23 |
| Mike Gardiner | 10 | 0 | 0 | 0 | 3.97 | 4 |
| John Kiely | 8 | 0 | 2 | 0 | 7.71 | 3 |
| Mike Munoz | 8 | 0 | 1 | 0 | 6.00 | 1 |
| Dave Johnson | 6 | 1 | 1 | 0 | 12.96 | 7 |
| Mark Grater | 6 | 0 | 0 | 0 | 5.40 | 4 |
| John DeSilva | 1 | 0 | 0 | 0 | 9.00 | 0 |

== Farm system ==
| Level | Team | League | Manager |
|---|---|---|---|
| AAA | Toledo Mud Hens | International League | Joe Sparks |
| AA | London Tigers | Eastern League | Tom Runnells |
| A | Lakeland Tigers | Florida State League | Gerry Groninger |
| A | Fayetteville Generals | South Atlantic League | Mark Wagner |
| A-Short Season | Niagara Falls Rapids | New York–Penn League | Larry Parrish |
| Rookie | Bristol Tigers | Appalachian League | Rubén Amaro, Sr. |

LEAGUE CHAMPIONS: Niagara Falls
