= 1993 Texas Rangers season =

1993 Texas Rangers
- League: American League
- Division: West
- Ballpark: Arlington Stadium
- City: Arlington, Texas
- Record: 86–76 (.531)
- Divisional place: 2nd
- Owners: George W. Bush
- General managers: Tom Grieve
- Managers: Kevin Kennedy
- Television: KTVT (Jim Sundberg, Steve Busby); HSE (Greg Lucas, Norm Hitzges)
- Radio: WBAP (Eric Nadel, Mark Holtz ) KXEB (Luis Mayoral, Mario Díaz Oroszo)

The 1993 Texas Rangers season was the 33rd of the Texas Rangers franchise overall, their 22nd in Arlington as the Rangers, and the 22nd and final season at Arlington Stadium before moving to The Ballpark in Arlington. The Rangers finished second in the American League West with a record of 86 wins and 76 losses. Before the 1993 season, Nolan Ryan announced his retirement, effective at the end of that season.

== Offseason ==
- December 15, 1992: Tom Henke was signed as a free agent with the Texas Rangers.
- December 18, 1992: Rob Ducey was signed as a free agent with the Texas Rangers.
- December 19, 1992: Manuel Lee was signed as a free agent with the Texas Rangers.
- December 19, 1992: Doug Dascenzo was signed as a free agent with the Texas Rangers.
- January 13, 1993: Mario Díaz was signed as a free agent with the Texas Rangers.
- February 1, 1993: Billy Ripken was signed as a free agent with the Texas Rangers.
- February 8, 1993: Steve Balboni was signed as a free agent with the Texas Rangers.
- March 22, 1993: Mike Schooler was signed as a free agent with the Texas Rangers.

== Regular season ==
- On May 26, 1993, during a game against the Cleveland Indians, Carlos Martínez hit a fly ball that Canseco lost in the lights as he was crossing the warning track. The ball hit him in the head and bounced over the wall for a home run. The cap Jose was wearing on that play, which This Week in Baseball rated in 1998 as the greatest blooper of the show's first 21 years, is in the Seth Swirsky collection. After the incident, the Harrisburg Heat offered him a soccer contract.
- May 29, 1993 – José Canseco asked his manager, Kevin Kennedy, to let him pitch the eighth inning of a runaway loss to the Boston Red Sox. While pitching, he injured his arm, underwent Tommy John surgery, and was lost for the remainder of the season, leading him to suffer further indignity and ridicule.
- On August 4, just before the end, Ryan had yet another high-profile moment – this time an on-the-mound fight. After Ryan hit Robin Ventura of the Chicago White Sox, Ventura charged the mound in order to fight Ryan, who was 20 years his senior. Ryan secured the 26-year-old Ventura in a headlock with his left arm, while pummelling Ventura's head with his right fist six times before catcher Iván Rodríguez was able to pull Ventura away from Ryan. Ryan stated afterwards it was the same maneuver he used on steers he had to brand on his Texas ranch. Videos of the incident were played that evening throughout the country. While Ventura and White Sox manager Gene Lamont were ejected, Ryan–who had barely moved from his spot on the mound in the fracas–was allowed to remain in the game and pitched hitless ball the rest of the way. Ryan had determined to be more aggressive after coming out on the wrong side of an altercation with Dave Winfield's beating in 1980.
- September 17, 1993: Greg Myers of the Angels was the final strikeout victim of Nolan Ryan. It would be Ryan's 5,714th strikeout.
- On September 22, 1993, Nolan Ryan's arm finally gave out. In Seattle, Ryan tore a ligament, ending his career two starts earlier than planned. Briefly attempting to pitch past the injury, Ryan threw one further pitch after tearing his ligament; with his injured arm, his final pitch was measured at 98 miles per hour. Ryan's last start was his worst; he allowed a single, four walks, and a grand slam in the top of the first without recording an out. (Ryan left trailing 5-0, and the fourth walk was completed by a reliever after Ryan's injury, but credited to Ryan.)

=== Season standings ===
AL West
Team	W	L	Pct.	GB	Home	Road
Chicago White Sox	94	68	.580	—	45‍–‍36	49‍–‍32
Texas Rangers	86	76	.531	8	50‍–‍31	36‍–‍45
Kansas City Royals	84	78	.519	10	43‍–‍38	41‍–‍40
Seattle Mariners	82	80	.506	12	46‍–‍35	36‍–‍45
California Angels	71	91	.438	23	44‍–‍37	27‍–‍54
Minnesota Twins	71	91	.438	23	36‍–‍45	35‍–‍46
Oakland Athletics	68	94	.420	26	38‍–‍43	30‍–‍51

=== Record vs. opponents ===
1993 American League record Source: MLB Standings Grid – 1993
Team	BAL	BOS	CAL	CWS	CLE	DET	KC	MIL	MIN	NYY	OAK	SEA	TEX	TOR
Baltimore	—	6–7	7–5	4–8	8–5	5–8	7–5	8–5	8–4	6–7	10–2	7–5	4–8	5–8
Boston	7–6	—	7–5	7–5	5–8	6–7	5–7	5–8	7–5	6–7	9–3	7–5	6–6	3–10
California	5–7	5–7	—	7–6	5–7	4–8	6–7	7–5	4–9	6–6	6–7	6–7	6–7	4–8
Chicago	8–4	5–7	6–7	—	9–3	7–5	6–7	9–3	10–3	4–8	7–6	9–4	8–5	6–6
Cleveland	5–8	8–5	7–5	3–9	—	6–7	7–5	8–5	4–8	6–7	8–4	3–9	7–5	4–9
Detroit	8–5	7–6	8–4	5–7	7–6	—	5–7	8–5	6–6	4–9	8–4	7–5	6–6	6–7
Kansas City	5–7	7–5	7–6	7–6	5–7	7–5	—	5–7	7–6	6–6	6–7	7–6	7–6	8–4
Milwaukee	5–8	8–5	5–7	3–9	5–8	5–8	7–5	—	7–5	4–9	7–5	4–8	4–8	5–8
Minnesota	4–8	5–7	9–4	3–10	8–4	6–6	6–7	5–7	—	4–8	8–5	4–9	7–6	2–10
New York	7–6	7–6	6–6	8–4	7–6	9–4	6–6	9–4	8–4	—	6–6	7–5	3–9	5–8
Oakland	2–10	3–9	7–6	6–7	4–8	4–8	7–6	5–7	5–8	6–6	—	9–4	5–8	5–7
Seattle	5–7	5–7	7–6	4–9	9–3	5–7	6–7	8–4	9–4	5–7	4–9	—	8–5	7–5
Texas	8–4	6–6	7–6	5–8	5–7	6–6	6–7	8–4	6–7	9–3	8–5	5–8	—	7–5
Toronto	8–5	10–3	8–4	6–6	9–4	7–6	4–8	8–5	10–2	8–5	7–5	5–7	5–7	—

=== Notable transactions ===
- September 11, 1993: Mike Schooler was released by the Texas Rangers.

=== Roster ===
1993 Texas Rangers
Roster
Pitchers: 45 Brian Bohanon; 51 Jeff Bronkey; 41 Kevin Brown; 28 Todd Burns; 31 Cris Carpenter; 24 Steve Dreyer; 30 Héctor Fajardo; 50 Tom Henke; 11 Craig Lefferts; 32 Charlie Leibrandt; 23 Gene Nelson; 31 Robb Nen; 28 Darren Oliver; 38 Bob Patterson; 59 Roger Pavlik; 39 Rick Reed; 37 Kenny Rogers; 34 Nolan Ryan; 23 Mike Schooler; 27 Matt Whiteside	Catchers: 12 Geno Petralli; 7 Iván Rodríguez; 17,25 John Russell; Infielders: 6 Mario Díaz; 22,23 Benji Gil; 9 Jeff Huson; 2 Manuel Lee; 25 Rafael Palmeiro; 16 Dean Palmer; 3 Billy Ripken; 10 Jon Shave; 20 Doug Strange	Outfielders: 33 Jose Canseco; 29 Doug Dascenzo; 13 Butch Davis; 40 Rob Ducey; 19 Juan González; 18 Donald Harris; 15 David Hulse; 4 Chris James; 17 Dan Peltier; 5 Gary Redus; Other batters: 36 Steve Balboni; 14 Julio Franco	Manager: 44 Kevin Kennedy; Coaches: 43 Mickey Hatcher (first base); 47 Perry Hill (assistant); 42 Jackie Moore (bench); 26 Dave Oliver (third base); 48 Claude Osteen (pitching); 46 Willie Upshaw (hitting)

== Player stats ==
= Indicates team leader

= Indicates league leader

=== Batting ===
==== Starters by position ====
Note: G = Games played; AB = At bats; R = Runs; H = Hits; Avg. = Batting average; HR = Home runs; RBI = Runs batted in; SB = Stolen bases

Pos	Player	G	AB	R	H	Avg.	HR	RBI	SB
C	Iván Rodríguez	137	473	56	129	.273	10	66	7
1B	Rafael Palmeiro	160	597	124	176	.295	37	105	7
2B	Doug Strange	145	484	58	124	.256	7	60	6
3B	Dean Palmer	148	519	88	127	.245	33	96	11
SS	Manuel Lee	73	205	31	45	.220	1	12	2
LF	Juan González	140	536	105	166	.310	46	118	4
CF	David Hulse	114	407	71	118	.290	1	29	29
RF	Jose Canseco	60	231	30	59	.255	10	46	6
DH	Julio Franco	144	532	85	154	.289	14	84	9

==== Other batters ====
Note: G = Games played; AB = At bats; R = Runs; H = Hits; Avg. = Batting average; HR = Home runs; RBI = Runs batted in; SB = Stolen bases

Player	G	AB	R	H	Avg.	HR	RBI	SB
Gary Redus	77	222	28	64	.288	6	31	4
Mario Díaz	71	205	24	56	.273	2	24	1
Dan Peltier	65	160	23	43	.269	1	17	0
Butch Davis	62	159	24	39	.245	3	20	3
Doug Dascenzo	76	146	20	29	.199	2	10	2
Geno Petralli	59	133	16	32	.241	1	13	2
Billy Ripken	50	132	12	25	.189	0	11	0
Rob Ducey	27	85	15	24	.282	2	9	2
Donald Harris	40	76	10	15	.197	1	8	0
Benji Gil	22	57	3	7	.123	0	2	1
Jon Shave	17	47	3	15	.319	0	7	1
Jeff Huson	23	45	3	6	.133	0	2	0
Chris James	8	31	5	11	.355	3	7	0
John Russell	18	22	1	5	.227	1	3	0
Steve Balboni	2	5	0	3	.600	0	0	0

=== Pitching ===
==== Starting pitchers ====
Note: G = Games pitched; IP = Innings pitched; W = Wins; L = Losses; ERA = Earned run average; SO = Strikeouts

Player	G	IP	W	L	ERA	SO
Kevin Brown	34	233.0	15	12	3.59	142
Kenny Rogers	35	208.1	16	10	4.10	140
Roger Pavlik	26	166.1	12	6	3.41	131
Charlie Leibrandt	26	150.1	9	10	4.55	89
Nolan Ryan	13	66.1	5	5	4.88	46

==== Other pitchers ====
Note: G = Games pitched; IP = Innings pitched; W = Wins; L = Losses; ERA = Earned run average; SO = Strikeouts

Player	G	IP	W	L	ERA	SO
Brian Bohanon	36	92.2	4	4	4.76	45
Todd Burns	25	65.0	0	4	4.57	35
Steve Dreyer	10	41.0	3	3	5.71	23
Robb Nen	9	22.2	1	1	6.35	12

==== Relief pitchers ====
Note: G = Games pitched; IP = Innings pitched; W = Wins; L = Losses; SV = Saves; ERA = Earned run average; SO = Strikeouts

Player	G	IP	W	L	SV	ERA	SO
Tom Henke	66	74.1	5	5	40	2.91	79
Matt Whiteside	60	73.0	2	1	1	4.32	39
Craig Lefferts	52	83.1	3	9	0	6.05	58
Bob Patterson	52	52.2	2	4	1	4.78	46
Cris Carpenter	27	32.0	4	1	1	4.22	27
Jeff Bronkey	21	36.0	1	1	1	4.00	18
Mike Schooler	17	24.1	3	0	0	5.55	16
Gene Nelson	6	8.0	0	0	1	3.38	4
Rick Reed	2	4.0	1	0	0	2.25	2
Darren Oliver	2	3.1	0	0	0	2.70	4
José Canseco	1	1.0	0	0	0	27.00	0
Héctor Fajardo	1	0.2	0	0	0	0.00	1

== Awards and honors ==
- Juan González, A.L. Home Run Champ
- Juan González, Silver Slugger Award
- Iván Rodríguez, C, Gold Glove

All-Star Game

== Farm system ==
Level	Team	League	Manager
AAA	Oklahoma City 89ers	American Association	Bobby Jones
AA	Tulsa Drillers	Texas League	Stan Cliburn
A	Charlotte Rangers	Florida State League	Tommy Thompson
A	Charleston Rainbows	South Atlantic League	Walt Williams
A-Short Season	Erie Sailors	New York–Penn League	Doug Sisson
Rookie	GCL Rangers	Gulf Coast League	Chino Cadahia

LEAGUE CHAMPIONS: GCL Rangers
