= Luis Alicea =

Puerto Rican baseball player and coach (born 1965)

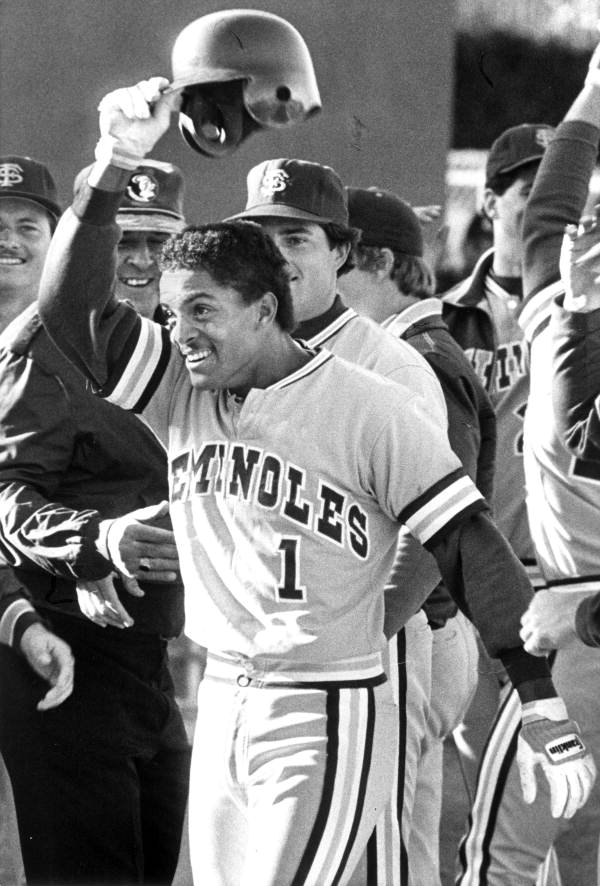
- Alicea with Florida State in 1986
- Second baseman
- Born: July 29, 1965 (age 60); Santurce, Puerto Rico
- Batted: Switch Threw: Right

MLB debut
- April 23, 1988, for the St. Louis Cardinals

Last MLB appearance
- September 25, 2002, for the Kansas City Royals

MLB statistics
- Batting average: .260
- Home runs: 47
- Runs batted in: 422
- Stats at Baseball Reference

Teams
- As player: St. Louis Cardinals (1988, 1991–1994); Boston Red Sox (1995); St. Louis Cardinals (1996); Anaheim Angels (1997); Texas Rangers (1998–2000); Kansas City Royals (2001–2002); As coach: Boston Red Sox (2007–2008); New York Mets (2009)

Career highlights and awards
- World Series champion (2007)

Luis René Alicea de Jesús (born July 29, 1965) is a Puerto Rican former Major League Baseball second baseman and coach.

Alicea played for the Kansas City Royals, Texas Rangers, Anaheim Angels, St. Louis Cardinals and Boston Red Sox. He played college baseball for the Florida State University Seminoles with his brother Edwin under head coach Mike Martin.

Alicea played 13 seasons, during which he played in 1,341 games. He was a career .260 hitter, with 47 home runs and 422 runs batted in. He had a lifetime .346 on-base percentage, and a .369 slugging percentage. He ranked in the top 5 in triples three times in his career (1992, 1997, 2000).

In 12 career postseason games, Alicea batted .267, with a .371 on-base percentage.

== St. Louis Cardinals ==
He was drafted by the St. Louis Cardinals in the first round (23rd pick) of the 1986 amateur draft. He made his major league debut in a 12–9 Cardinals loss to the New York Mets on April 23, 1988. Starting at second base and batting eighth, Alicea went 1-for-4 with a triple, a walk and a run scored in his debut. He hit .212 with one home run and 24 RBI in 93 games with the Cardinals that season.

Alicea spent the next few seasons in the minor leagues before returning to the big leagues with St. Louis in 1991, hitting .191 without a single RBI in 56 games. Despite his struggles, the Cardinals brought him back to the big leagues in 1992 and he hit .245 with a pair of homers and 32 RBI in 85 games. He continued to improve as, in 1993, Alicea hit .279 with three home runs and 46 RBI, stealing 11 bases in 12 attempts, over 115 games. Despite a drop in playing time in 1994, Alicea set a then-career high in home runs with five while hitting .278 with 29 RBI in 88 games.

== Boston Red Sox ==
On December 7, 1994, he was traded to the Boston Red Sox for Jeff McNeely and Nate Minchey. He played one season with the Red Sox, batting .270 with six homers and 44 RBI. Alicea was one of a few Boston players to perform well in the 1995 American League Division Series against the Cleveland Indians. He hit .600 (6-for-10) with a double and home run as the Red Sox were swept in three games.

== St. Louis Cardinals, second stint ==
Alicea was waived by the Red Sox, returning to the Cardinals on a one-year, $500,000 contract on March 19, 1996. He hit .258 with five home runs and 42 RBI in 129 games for St. Louis.

== Anaheim Angels ==
In January 1997, Alicea signed a one-year deal with the Anaheim Angels, taking over at second base for Randy Velarde. In 128 games with the Angels, Alicea hit .253 with five home runs and 37 RBI, stealing a career-high 22 bases.

== Texas Rangers ==
In December 1997, Alicea signed a two-year, $1.5 million deal with the Texas Rangers. In his first season in Texas, Alicea hit .274 with six home runs and 33 RBI in 101 games. In 1999, he hit .201 with three homers and 17 RBI in 68 games with the Rangers.

It was in 2000 that he had his best season establishing career highs with a .294 average, 85 runs, 159 hits, and 63 RBI.

== Kansas City Royals ==
He played his last two seasons with the Kansas City Royals before retiring following the 2002 season. In 2001, Alicea hit .274 with four home runs and 32 RBI in 113 games. In his final big league campaign, he hit .228 with a homer and 23 RBI in 94 games.

== Coaching career ==
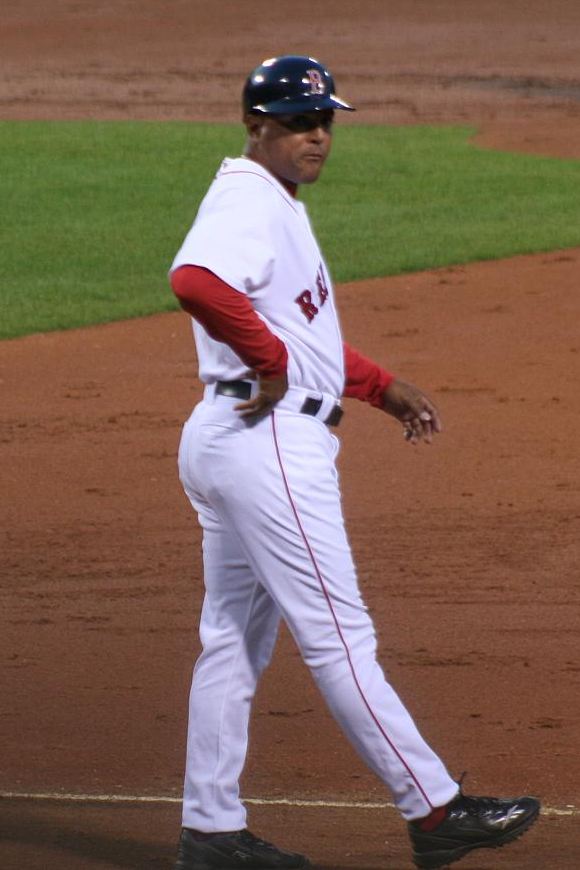
Alicea as first base coach for the Boston Red Sox in 2008

After his playing days ended, he managed the Lowell Spinners in 2004 and 2005 and was skipper of the Greenville Drive in 2006.

On November 29, 2006, Alicea was named by the Red Sox as their first base coach, taking over for Bill Haselman. He served in this position through the 2007 and 2008 seasons. On October 22, 2008, Alicea was told by manager Terry Francona that he was not going to be offered a contract for 2009.

Alicea was then hired by the New York Mets to be their first base coach for the 2009 season. On October 5, 2009, after the Mets' dismal 70–92 season, they announced that Alicea would not return to the Mets coaching staff in the 2010 season.

== See also ==
- List of Major League Baseball players from Puerto Rico

Sporting positions
| Preceded by Lynn Jones | Lowell Spinners manager 2004–2005 | Succeeded by Bruce Crabbe |
| Preceded by Bill Haselman | Boston Red Sox first base coach 2007–2008 | Succeeded by Tim Bogar |
| Preceded by Ken Oberkfell | New York Mets first base coach 2009 | Succeeded by Razor Shines |
