= William Wirtz =

William Wirtz may refer to:

- W. Willard Wirtz (1912–2010), U.S. administrator, cabinet officer, attorney and law professor
- Bill Wirtz (1929–2007), chief executive officer of the family-owned Wirtz Corporation
- William Wirtz (American football) (1887–1965), American football, basketball, and baseball coach

== See also ==
- Bill Wertz (born 1967), American former Major League Baseball player
- Bill Wurtz, American singer-songwriter, multi-instrumentalist and online video creator
