= Iván Calderón =

Iván Calderón can refer to:

- Iván Calderón (baseball) (1962–2003), Puerto Rican baseball player and murder victim
- Iván Calderón (boxer) (born 1975), Puerto Rican Olympic boxer and professional boxing champion
