= Roger Smithberg =

American baseball player (born 1966)

- Pitcher
- Born: March 21, 1966 (age 60); Elgin, Illinois, U.S.
- Batted: Right Threw: Right

MLB debut
- September 1, 1993, for the Oakland Athletics

Last MLB appearance
- July 2, 1994, for the Oakland Athletics

MLB statistics
- Win–loss record: 1–2
- Earned run average: 4.09
- Strikeouts: 7
- Stats at Baseball Reference

Teams
- Oakland Athletics (1993–1994)

Roger Craig Smithberg (born March 21, 1966) is an American former professional baseball pitcher. He played two seasons in Major League Baseball (MLB) for the Oakland Athletics, appearing in 13 games during the 1993 season and two games during the 1994 season.
