= Jim Byrd =

American baseball player (born 1968)

- Pinch runner
- Born: October 3, 1968; Wewahitchka, Florida, U.S.
- Batted: Right Threw: Right

MLB debut
- May 31, 1993, for the Boston Red Sox

Last MLB appearance
- June 1, 1993, for the Boston Red Sox

MLB statistics
- Games played: 2
- At bats: 0
- Hits: 0
- Stats at Baseball Reference

Teams
- Boston Red Sox (1993)

James Edward Byrd (born October 3, 1968) is an American former Major League Baseball player. He batted and threw right-handed.

The Boston Red Sox selected Byrd in the eighth round of the 1987 MLB draft out of Seminole State College. He had a brief major league career in the 1993 season, as he was used by the Red Sox in two games exclusively as a pinch runner for Andre Dawson (May 31) and Ernest Riles (June 1), during a series against the Kansas City Royals at Fenway Park.

Byrd also spent seven seasons in the Boston and Milwaukee Brewers Minor League systems, playing mostly at shortstop for six different teams. In a 773-game career, he posted a .219 batting average with 21 home runs and 99 stolen bases, driving in 190 runs while scoring 282 times.

After his playing days, Byrd managed from 1996 through 2000 for the Gulf Coast Rangers (1996), Port Charlotte Rangers (1998–2000) and Tulsa Drillers (2000).
