= 1993 Kansas City Royals season =

1993 Kansas City Royals
- League: American League
- Division: West Division
- Ballpark: Kauffman Stadium
- City: Kansas City, Missouri
- Owners: David Glass
- General manager: Herk Robinson
- Managers: Hal McRae
- Television: KSMO-TV (Paul Splittorff, Dave Armstrong)
- Radio: WIBW (AM) (Denny Matthews, Fred White)

The 1993 Kansas City Royals season was a season in American baseball. It involved the Royals finishing 3rd in the American League West with a record of 84 wins and 78 losses. This was George Brett's final season in the major leagues, as well as the team's final season in the AL West.

== Offseason ==
- November 17, 1992: Kerwin Moore was drafted from the Royals by the Florida Marlins as the 61st pick in the 1992 MLB expansion draft.
- November 19, 1992: Dennis Moeller and Joel Johnston were traded by the Royals to the Pittsburgh Pirates for José Lind.
- November 25, 1992: Mark Gubicza was signed as a free agent by the Royals.
- December 8, 1992: David Cone was signed as a free agent by the Royals.
- December 8, 1992: Greg Gagne was signed as a free agent by the Royals.
- December 9, 1992: Jeff Shaw and Tim Spehr were traded by the Royals to the Montreal Expos for Mark Gardner and Doug Piatt.
- January 27, 1993: Hubie Brooks was signed as a free agent by the Royals.
- February 22, 1993: Gregg Jefferies and Ed Gerald (minors) were traded by the Royals to the St. Louis Cardinals for Félix José and Craig Wilson.
- February 26, 1993: Scott Bailes was signed as a free agent with the Kansas City Royals.

== Regular season ==
=== Season standings ===
AL West
Team	W	L	Pct.	GB	Home	Road
Chicago White Sox	94	68	.580	—	45‍–‍36	49‍–‍32
Texas Rangers	86	76	.531	8	50‍–‍31	36‍–‍45
Kansas City Royals	84	78	.519	10	43‍–‍38	41‍–‍40
Seattle Mariners	82	80	.506	12	46‍–‍35	36‍–‍45
California Angels	71	91	.438	23	44‍–‍37	27‍–‍54
Minnesota Twins	71	91	.438	23	36‍–‍45	35‍–‍46
Oakland Athletics	68	94	.420	26	38‍–‍43	30‍–‍51

=== Record vs. opponents ===
1993 American League record Source: MLB Standings Grid – 1993
Team	BAL	BOS	CAL	CWS	CLE	DET	KC	MIL	MIN	NYY	OAK	SEA	TEX	TOR
Baltimore	—	6–7	7–5	4–8	8–5	5–8	7–5	8–5	8–4	6–7	10–2	7–5	4–8	5–8
Boston	7–6	—	7–5	7–5	5–8	6–7	5–7	5–8	7–5	6–7	9–3	7–5	6–6	3–10
California	5–7	5–7	—	7–6	5–7	4–8	6–7	7–5	4–9	6–6	6–7	6–7	6–7	4–8
Chicago	8–4	5–7	6–7	—	9–3	7–5	6–7	9–3	10–3	4–8	7–6	9–4	8–5	6–6
Cleveland	5–8	8–5	7–5	3–9	—	6–7	7–5	8–5	4–8	6–7	8–4	3–9	7–5	4–9
Detroit	8–5	7–6	8–4	5–7	7–6	—	5–7	8–5	6–6	4–9	8–4	7–5	6–6	6–7
Kansas City	5–7	7–5	7–6	7–6	5–7	7–5	—	5–7	7–6	6–6	6–7	7–6	7–6	8–4
Milwaukee	5–8	8–5	5–7	3–9	5–8	5–8	7–5	—	7–5	4–9	7–5	4–8	4–8	5–8
Minnesota	4–8	5–7	9–4	3–10	8–4	6–6	6–7	5–7	—	4–8	8–5	4–9	7–6	2–10
New York	7–6	7–6	6–6	8–4	7–6	9–4	6–6	9–4	8–4	—	6–6	7–5	3–9	5–8
Oakland	2–10	3–9	7–6	6–7	4–8	4–8	7–6	5–7	5–8	6–6	—	9–4	5–8	5–7
Seattle	5–7	5–7	7–6	4–9	9–3	5–7	6–7	8–4	9–4	5–7	4–9	—	8–5	7–5
Texas	8–4	6–6	7–6	5–8	5–7	6–6	6–7	8–4	6–7	9–3	8–5	5–8	—	7–5
Toronto	8–5	10–3	8–4	6–6	9–4	7–6	4–8	8–5	10–2	8–5	7–5	5–7	5–7	—

=== Notable transactions ===
- April 3, 1993: Scott Bailes was released by the Kansas City Royals.
- April 26, 1993: Mike Boddicker was purchased from the Royals by the Milwaukee Brewers.
- April 27, 1993: Tuffy Rhodes was signed as a free agent by the Royals.
- June 3, 1993: Jacque Jones was drafted by the Royals in the 31st round of the 1993 Major League Baseball draft, but did not sign.
- June 14, 1993: Dave Stieb was signed as a free agent by the Royals.
- June 19, 1993: Gary Gaetti was signed as a free agent by the Royals.
- July 30, 1993: Tuffy Rhodes was traded by the Royals to the Chicago Cubs as part of a 3-team trade. The New York Yankees sent John Habyan to the Royals. The Cubs sent Paul Assenmacher to the Yankees.
- July 30, 1993: Greg Cadaret was signed as a free agent by the Royals.
- July 31, 1993: Dave Stieb was released by the Royals.
- July 31, 1993: Jon Lieber and Dan Miceli were traded by the Royals to the Pittsburgh Pirates for Stan Belinda.
- August 1, 1993: Owner Ewing Kauffman, responsible for bringing major league baseball to Kansas City, dies at age 76.

=== Roster ===
1993 Kansas City Royals
Roster
Pitchers: 55 Kevin Appier; 50 Stan Belinda; 29 Billy Brewer; 51 Enrique Burgos; 31 Greg Cadaret; 17 David Cone; 31 Frank DiPino; 37 Mark Gardner; 36 Tom Gordon; 27 Jeff Granger; 23 Mark Gubicza; 41 John Habyan; 33 Chris Haney; 57 Mike Magnante; 28 Rusty Meacham; 21 Jeff Montgomery; 35 Hipólito Pichardo; 47 Dennis Rasmussen; 38 Rick Reed; 50 Bill Sampen	Catchers: 15 Mike Macfarlane; 24 Brent Mayne; 53 Nelson Santovenia; Infielders: 4 Gary Gaetti; 7 Greg Gagne; 48 Bob Hamelin; 25 Phil Hiatt; 6 David Howard; 12 Wally Joyner; 13 José Lind; 16 Keith Miller; 32 Rico Rossy; 3 Terry Shumpert; 19 Curtis Wilkerson; 8 Craig Wilson	Outfielders: 30 Hubie Brooks; 14 Chris Gwynn; 34 Félix José; 40 Kevin Koslofski; 56 Brian McRae; 22 Kevin McReynolds; 26,51 Harvey Pulliam; Other batters: 5 George Brett	Manager: 11 Hal McRae; Coaches: 43 Steve Boros; 44 Glenn Ezell; 46 Guy Hansen; 42 Bruce Kison; 45 Lee May

== Player stats ==
=== Batting ===
==== Starters by position ====
Note: Pos = Position; G = Games played; AB = At bats; H = Hits; Avg. = Batting average; HR = Home runs; RBI = Runs batted in

Pos	Player	G	AB	H	Avg.	HR	RBI
C	Mike Macfarlane	117	388	106	.273	20	67
1B	Wally Joyner	141	497	145	.292	15	65
2B	José Lind	136	431	107	.248	0	37
3B	Gary Gaetti	82	281	72	.256	14	46
SS	Greg Gagne	159	540	151	.280	10	57
LF	Kevin McReynolds	110	351	86	.245	11	42
CF	Brian McRae	153	627	177	.282	12	69
RF	Félix José	149	499	126	.253	6	43
DH	George Brett	145	560	149	.266	19	75

==== Other batters ====
Note: G = Games played; AB = At bats; H = Hits; Avg. = Batting average; HR = Home runs; RBI = Runs batted in

Player	G	AB	H	Avg.	HR	RBI
Chris Gwynn	103	287	86	.300	1	25
Phil Hiatt	81	238	52	.218	7	36
Brent Mayne	71	205	52	.254	2	22
Hubie Brooks	75	168	48	.286	1	24
Keith Miller	37	108	18	.167	0	3
Rico Rossy	46	86	19	.221	2	12
Harvey Pulliam	27	62	16	.258	1	6
Craig Wilson	21	49	13	.265	1	3
Bob Hamelin	16	49	11	.224	2	5
Curt Wilkerson	12	28	4	.143	0	0
Kevin Koslofski	15	26	7	.269	1	2
David Howard	15	24	8	.333	0	2
Terry Shumpert	8	10	1	.100	0	0
Nelson Santovenia	4	8	1	.125	0	0

=== Pitching ===
= Indicates league leader

==== Starting pitchers ====
Note: G = Games pitched; IP = Innings pitched; W = Wins; L = Losses; ERA = Earned run average; SO = Strikeouts

Player	G	IP	W	L	ERA	SO
David Cone	34	254.0	11	14	3.33	191
Kevin Appier	34	238.2	18	8	2.56	186
Hipólito Pichardo	30	165.0	7	8	4.04	70
Chris Haney	23	124.0	9	9	6.02	65
Mark Gardner	17	91.2	4	6	6.19	54
Mike Magnante	7	35.1	1	2	4.08	16

==== Other pitchers ====
Note: G = Games pitched; IP = Innings pitched; W = Wins; L = Losses; ERA = Earned run average; SO = Strikeouts

Player	G	IP	W	L	ERA	SO
Tom Gordon	48	155.2	12	6	3.58	143
Mark Gubicza	49	104.1	5	8	4.66	80
Dennis Rasmussen	9	29.0	1	2	7.45	12

==== Relief pitchers ====
Note: G = Games pitched; W = Wins; L = Losses; SV = Saves; ERA = Earned run average; SO = Strikeouts

Player	G	W	L	SV	ERA	SO
Jeff Montgomery	69	7	5	45	2.27	66
Billy Brewer	46	2	2	0	3.46	28
Stan Belinda	23	1	1	0	4.28	25
Bill Sampen	18	2	2	0	5.89	9
Rusty Meacham	15	2	2	0	5.57	13
Greg Cadaret	13	1	1	0	2.93	2
John Habyan	12	0	0	0	4.50	10
Frank DiPino	11	1	1	0	6.89	5
Enrique Burgos	5	0	1	0	9.00	6
Rick Reed	1	0	0	0	9.82	3
Jeff Granger	1	0	0	0	27.00	1

== Farm system ==
Level	Team	League	Manager
AAA	Omaha Royals	American Association	Jeff Cox
AA	Memphis Chicks	Southern League	Tom Poquette
A	Wilmington Blue Rocks	Carolina League	Ron Johnson
A	Rockford Royals	Midwest League	Mike Jirschele
A-Short Season	Eugene Emeralds	Northwest League	John Mizerock
Rookie	GCL Royals	Gulf Coast League	Bob Herold
