= Scott Cooper (baseball) =

American baseball player (born 1967)

- Third baseman
- Born: October 13, 1967 (age 58); St. Louis, Missouri, U.S.
- Batted: Left Threw: Right

Professional debut
- MLB: September 5, 1990, for the Boston Red Sox
- NPB: March 30, 1996, for the Seibu Lions

Last appearance
- NPB: August 8, 1996, for the Seibu Lions
- MLB: September 28, 1997, for the Kansas City Royals

MLB statistics
- Batting average: .265
- Home runs: 33
- Runs batted in: 211

NPB statistics
- Batting average: .243
- Home runs: 7
- Runs batted in: 27
- Stats at Baseball Reference

Teams
- Boston Red Sox (1990–1994); St. Louis Cardinals (1995); Seibu Lions (1996); Kansas City Royals (1997)

Career highlights and awards
- 2× All-Star (1993, 1994)

Scott Kendrick Cooper (born October 13, 1967) is an American former professional baseball third baseman. He played in Major League Baseball (MLB) for the Boston Red Sox, St. Louis Cardinals, and Kansas City Royals, and in Nippon Professional Baseball (NPB) for the Seibu Lions.

== Early years ==
Cooper attended Pattonville High School in nearby Maryland Heights, Missouri, where he was a standout at baseball, and played on their 1986 state championship team. He was selected by the Boston Red Sox in the third round of the 1986 MLB draft.

== Career ==
Cooper rose through the Red Sox minor league system, playing for the Elmira Pioneers (1986), Greensboro Hornets (1987), Lynchburg Red Sox (1988), New Britain Red Sox (1989), and Pawtucket Red Sox (1990–1991).

=== Boston Red Sox ===
Cooper made his major league debut with the Red Sox on September 5, 1990, as the Red Sox hosted the Oakland Athletics at Fenway Park. Appearing for Carlos Quintana as a pinch hitter in the ninth inning of a 10–0 A's win, Cooper struck out looking, which was his only MLB at bat that season.

Appearing in 14 games with Boston in 1991, Cooper hit .457 (16-for-35) with seven RBI. His first MLB hit came September 12, 1991, as a pinch hitter for Jody Reed, singling off New York Yankees pitcher Rich Monteleone in the eighth inning at Yankee Stadium. He picked up the first of his 33 career home runs on September 4, 1992, hitting a solo shot off A's star Dave Stewart in Oakland.

With future Hall of Fame third baseman Wade Boggs playing for the Red Sox, Cooper struggled to find time on the active roster and in ballgames. In 1992, Cooper played 62 games at first base; in 123 total games that season, he hit .276 with five home runs and 33 RBI over 337 at bats. When Boggs signed with the Yankees as a free agent in the offseason, Cooper became the starting third baseman and was selected to two All-Star teams.

Cooper's Red Sox career — the most productive seasons of his career — ended when he and reliever Cory Bailey were traded to the St. Louis Cardinals on April 9, 1995, for pitcher Rhéal Cormier and outfielder Mark Whiten.

==== Hitting for the cycle ====
On April 12, 1994, Cooper hit for the cycle in a 22–11 victory over the Kansas City Royals at Kauffman Stadium. Batting seventh and playing third base, Cooper hit a two-run double off Kevin Appier in the first inning, homered in the third inning, tripled off Hipólito Pichardo in the fifth inning (Cooper was called out at the plate trying to stretch it into an inside-the-park home run), reached on an error in sixth inning, hit another two-run double in the seventh inning off Jeff Montgomery, and singled in the ninth inning off infielder-turned-pitcher David Howard. Cooper hit the 18th cycle in Red Sox history, and was the first player to do so since Mike Greenwell in 1988.

==== All-Star games ====
In 1993 and 1994, Cooper was the lone Red Sox player named to the American League All-Star teams.

In 1993, Cooper entered the game as a replacement for former teammate Wade Boggs at third base in the sixth inning of the All-Star game at Oriole Park at Camden Yards in Baltimore. Cooper went 0-for-2, hitting a flyout to left field off Steve Avery in the sixth inning and striking out against Rod Beck in the seventh inning.

In 1994, Cooper again came into the game for Boggs in the sixth inning of the Midsummer Classic, which was played at Three Rivers Stadium that year. Cooper went 1-for-2 with a run scored and a RBI in the exhibition game. In the seventh inning, Cooper hit a RBI double off Danny Jackson in the seventh inning and grounded out to second base off reliever Randy Myers in the ninth inning.

Cooper went 1-for-4 with a double, a run scored and a RBI in his two All-Star game appearances.

=== St. Louis Cardinals ===
Cooper's Cardinals career got off to a good start when he made his debut with St. Louis on April 26, 1995, in a 7–6 Cards win over the Philadelphia Phillies at Busch Stadium. Hitting in the cleanup spot, Cooper went 3-for-5 in his Cardinals debut and hit a two-run walk-off single in the bottom of the ninth to secure the St. Louis victory. He finished the day with one run scored and four RBI. He continued to hit well early in the season, having a .302 average on May 25 only to finish the year with a .230 average, three homers, 40 RBI and 29 runs over 118 games. While he struggled in 1995, Cooper was paid a career-high $1,525,000 for the season.

Cooper filed for free agency at the end of the season but found himself without a job in MLB for 1996, instead signing a one-year deal with the Seibu Lions in Japan.

=== Seibu Lions ===
Unable to find a job in Major League Baseball in 1996, Cooper signed on with the Seibu Lions of the Pacific League in Japan. Appearing in 81 games with the Lions, Cooper hit .243 with seven home runs, 27 RBI and 27 runs scored. It was with the Lions that he was given the nickname "Super Duper Cooper Scooper" in recognition of his tremendous defense.

=== Kansas City Royals ===
On December 16, 1996, Cooper signed with the Kansas City Royals, earning $375,000 for the season. In 1996, the Royals had finished last in American League Central division at 75–86, 24 games behind the Cleveland Indians. Cooper was signed just three days after the Royals traded incumbent third baseman Joe Randa and three other players to the Pittsburgh Pirates for infielders Jay Bell and Jeff King. Cooper went to spring training as a non-roster invitee, and made the team.

Cooper hit just .201 with three home runs, 15 RBI and 12 runs over 159 at bats in 75 games for the 1997 Royals. By the end of the season, Cooper was primarily a defensive replacement and pinch hitter. In the last two games of his career, he appeared as a defensive replacement at third base without getting an at bat. His final MLB at bat came September 26, 1997, at Comiskey Park, striking out as a pinch hitter against Chicago White Sox lefty Jim Abbott.

A free agent at season's end, Cooper signed a minor league deal with the Texas Rangers, but was released in March 1998, without appearing in a game with the club.

== Post-playing career ==
In 1999, Cooper was named head coach of the Fontbonne College baseball team. He led the team for several seasons, and was named coach of the year for the St. Louis Intercollegiate Athletic Conference (SLIAC) in 2003. In 2005, Cooper became part-owner of a baseball training facility in the St. Louis area. In 2007, Cooper joined the staff of the St. Louis Gamers, a baseball program for 10 to 18 year-old players.

== See also ==
- List of Major League Baseball players to hit for the cycle

Achievements
| Preceded by Travis Fryman | Hitting for the cycle April 12, 1994 | Succeeded by Rondell White |
