= José Meléndez (pitcher, born 1965) =

Puerto Rican baseball player (born 1965)

- Pitcher
- Born: September 2, 1965 (age 60); Naguabo, Puerto Rico
- Batted: Right Threw: Right

MLB debut
- September 11, 1990, for the Seattle Mariners

Last MLB appearance
- August 9, 1994, for the Boston Red Sox

MLB statistics
- Win–loss record: 16–14
- Earned run average: 3.47
- Strikeouts: 172
- Stats at Baseball Reference

Teams
- Seattle Mariners (1990); San Diego Padres (1991–1992); Boston Red Sox (1993–1994)
Medals
Men's baseball
Representing Puerto Rico
Pan American Games
Bronze medal – third place	1987 Indianapolis	Team

José Luis Meléndez García (born September 2, 1965) is a Puerto Rican former pitcher in Major League Baseball (MLB) who played from 1990 through 1994 for the Seattle Mariners (1990), San Diego Padres (1991–92) and Boston Red Sox (1993–94). Listed at 6' 2", 175 lb., Meléndez batted and threw right-handed.

== Career ==
Meléndez was the first player from his hometown of Naguabo in eastern Puerto Rico to play in MLB. He signed as an amateur free agent with the Pittsburgh Pirates in August 1983. The Mariners selected him in the Rule 5 draft in late 1988, and he made his MLB debut with Seattle in 1990. He was claimed off waivers by the Padres in March 1991, then traded to the Red Sox after the 1992 season for Phil Plantier.

In a five-season career, Meléndez posted a 16–14 record with 172 strikeouts and a 3.47 ERA in 109 appearances, including 12 starts, 37 games finished, three saves, in 220 2/3 innings pitched.

Meléndez also pitched in the minor leagues for all those organizations and the Kansas City and New York Yankees from 1984 to 1996. In 12 seasons in the minors, he went 69–55 with 796 strikeouts and a 3.76 ERA in 891 innings.
