= Jeff Russell =

American baseball player (born 1961)

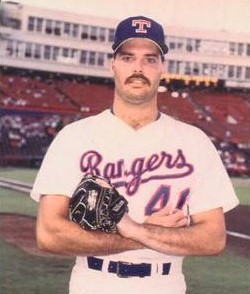
- Pitcher
- Born: September 2, 1961 (age 64); Cincinnati, Ohio, U.S.
- Batted: Right Threw: Right

MLB debut
- August 13, 1983, for the Cincinnati Reds

Last MLB appearance
- September 27, 1996, for the Texas Rangers

MLB statistics
- Win–loss record: 56–73
- Earned run average: 3.75
- Strikeouts: 693
- Saves: 186
- Stats at Baseball Reference

Teams
- Cincinnati Reds (1983–1984); Texas Rangers (1985–1992); Oakland Athletics (1992); Boston Red Sox (1993–1994); Cleveland Indians (1994); Texas Rangers (1995–1996)

Career highlights and awards
- 2× All-Star (1988, 1989); AL Rolaids Relief Man Award (1989); AL saves leader (1989); Texas Rangers Hall of Fame

Jeffrey Lee Russell (born September 2, 1961) is an American former Major League Baseball pitcher who played 14 years from 1983 to 1996. Russell played for the Cincinnati Reds of the National League and the Texas Rangers, Oakland A's, Boston Red Sox and Cleveland Indians, all of the American League. He began his career as a starting pitcher with the Reds and Rangers, but was later converted into a closer.

A two-time American League All-Star in 1988 and 1989, Russell finished his Major League career with 186 career saves. In 1989, as a member of the Rangers, he led the A.L. in saves with 38 and won the 1989 A.L. Rolaids Relief Man Award.

Russell's son, James Russell, made the Opening Day roster of the Chicago Cubs in 2010.

Russell became the pitching coach for the San Rafael Pacifics in 2013, where his youngest son Casey was in the starting rotation. In 2014, he became the pitching coach for the Grand Prairie AirHogs.

== College and Minor Leagues ==
The Cincinnati Reds selected Russell out of Wyoming High School in the 5th round of the 1979 Major League Baseball draft. Rather than immediately sign a professional contract, Russell enrolled in Gulf Coast Community College. Russell instead made his pro debut the following year, as part of the starting rotation for the Eugene Emeralds of the Northwest League. At Eugene, Russell was teammates with outfielder Eric Davis, who went on to reach stardom with the Reds in the 1980s. The team, which finished 37–33, was led by future San Diego Padres manager Greg Riddoch. In 1981, Russell was promoted to the Florida State League, where he played for the Reds affiliate, the Tampa Tarpons. While at Tampa, Russell started 21 games, and finished with a 10-4 second, second behind Nick Fiorillo for most wins on the team. By 1983, Russell was pitching for the Indianapolis Indians, the Reds Triple-A team, with whom he went 5-5 and earned the first save of his baseball career.

== Major League Career ==
On August 13, 1983, playing in front of the home crowd at Riverfront Stadium, Russell made his major league debut at the age of 21. In his major league debut, Russell pitched a complete game, allowing just five hits in the Reds 3–1 victory over the San Diego Padres. In addition to pitching a complete game in his major league debut, Russell got his first career hit and RBI. In the bottom of the 6th inning, Russell got a hit off Padres starter John Montefusco, a double that drove in Dann Bilardello for the third and final run. Russell finished his first season in the big leagues with a 4–5 record and an ERA of 3.03.

Jeff finished the 1984 season with a 6–18 record and an ERA of 4.26. Not only did Jeff flirt with losing 20 games in a season, but he ended up leading the NL in losses with 18. On July 23, 1985, Russell was the player to be named later in a huge trade. The Texas Rangers sent third baseman Buddy Bell to the Reds for outfielder Duane Walker. During his time in Texas, Russell was a steady part of the starting rotation and a two-time All-Star. He was soon converted to relief and in 1989, he led the American League in saves with 38. Russell remained the closer with the Rangers until 1992, when he was part of another blockbuster trade. The Texas Rangers sent Russell, outfielder Ruben Sierra, and pitcher Bobby Witt to the Oakland A's in exchange for outfielder Jose Canseco. Russell finished the season with the A's before signing with the Boston Red Sox the following spring. Russell saved 33 games for Boston in 1993. Midway through the 1994 season, Russell was traded to the Cleveland Indians for pitchers Steve Farr and Chris Nabholz. Russell spent the rest of the year with Cleveland before becoming a free agent and returning to Texas, where he spent the last two years of his career.

== Post career ==
Russell took time off after he retired to spend with his family. He later ventured on a coaching career that would land him with the independent Texas Airdogs.

== Awards and leaderboards ==
In 1984, Russell finished tenth in the league in hit by pitch, and eighth in shutouts with two. He was the 1989 American League Rolaids relief pitcher of the year. In 2017, the Texas Rangers inducted Russell and former outfielder Juan González into the franchise's hall of fame. Russell's plaque lists him as the busiest relief pitcher in Rangers history.

== See also ==
- List of Major League Baseball annual saves leaders
- List of second-generation Major League Baseball players
