= Cory Bailey =

American baseball player (born 1971)

- Pitcher
- Born: January 24, 1971 (age 55); Marion, Illinois, U.S.
- Batted: Right Threw: Right

Professional debut
- MLB: September 1, 1993, for the Boston Red Sox
- NPB: April 11, 2003, for the Yomiuri Giants
- CPBL: March 4, 2004, for the La New Bears

Last appearance
- MLB: July 3, 2002, for the Kansas City Royals
- NPB: October 7, 2003, for the Yomiuri Giants
- CPBL: October 4, 2008, for the dmedia T-REX

MLB statistics
- Win–loss record: 9–10
- Earned run average: 3.96
- Strikeouts: 150

NPB statistics
- Win–loss record: 1–0
- Earned run average: 4.79
- Strikeouts: 32

CPBL statistics
- Win–loss record: 23–27
- Earned run average: 3.18
- Strikeouts: 238
- Stats at Baseball Reference

Teams
- Boston Red Sox (1993–1994); St. Louis Cardinals (1995–1996); San Francisco Giants (1997–1998); Kansas City Royals (2001–2002); Yomiuri Giants (2003); La New Bears (2004–2005); dmedia T-REX (2008)

Phillip Cory Bailey (born January 24, 1971) is an American former professional baseball pitcher who played in Major League Baseball between 1993 and 2002. He batted and threw right-handed.

== Biography ==
A Crab Orchard High School and Marion High School graduate, Bailey was an outstanding pitcher for Southeastern Illinois College from 1989-1991 and was named to the All-Region team. Selected by the Boston Red Sox in the 1991 draft, he pitched for four Major League clubs in part of eight seasons, filling relief roles coming out from the bullpen as a middle reliever and as a set-up man as well. In a spring training game on April 2, 1993, Frank Viola and Bailey combined on a no-hitter as the Red Sox defeated the Phillies 10–0 at Jack Russell Memorial Stadium in Clearwater, Florida.

Bailey reached the majors in 1993 with the Boston Red Sox, spending two years with them before moving to the St. Louis Cardinals (1995-1996), San Francisco Giants (1997-1998) and Kansas City Royals (2001-2002). His most productive season came in 1996 with St. Louis, when he posted career-highs with five wins and a 3.00 ERA. He had another decent season in 2001 for Kansas City, striking out 61 batters in 67 1/3 innings, also career-numbers. In 172 games, Bailey compiled a 9–10 record with one save a 3.96 ERA.

On April 10, 2002, Bailey notched his one and only MLB save against the Red Sox. He pitched 1 1/3 innings, striking out 3 and preserving the 6-2 Royals victory. On May 26, 2002, Bailey won both ends of a doubleheader against the Texas Rangers, becoming the first pitcher since David Wells in 1989 to accomplish the feat.

After that, he played with the Yomiuri Giants in Japan's Central League (2003-2004), La New Bears of Taiwan's Chinese Professional Baseball League (2005), Long Island Ducks of the independent Atlantic League (2006), Iowa Cubs which is a Triple-A team of the Chicago Cubs (2007)

== Personal ==
The city of Marion, where Bailey was born, named a street after him, and the Crab Orchard High School is located on Cory Bailey Street.

Bailey is currently working at Future Swings in Marion, IL.
