= Ángel Miranda =

Puerto Rican baseball player (born 1969)

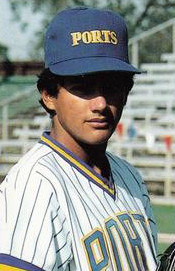
- Miranda in 1988
- Pitcher
- Born: November 9, 1969 (age 56); Arecibo, Puerto Rico
- Batted: Left Threw: Left

MLB debut
- June 5, 1993, for the Milwaukee Brewers

Last MLB appearance
- June 6, 1997, for the Milwaukee Brewers

MLB statistics
- Win–loss record: 17–21
- Earned run average: 4.46
- Strikeouts: 243

CPBL statistics
- Win–loss record: 2–2
- Earned run average: 2.78
- Strikeouts: 33
- Stats at Baseball Reference

Teams
- Milwaukee Brewers (1993–1997); Mercuries Tigers (1998)

Ángel Luis Miranda Andújar (born November 9, 1969) is a Puerto Rican former professional baseball pitcher. He played all or parts of five seasons in Major League Baseball, from 1993 until 1997, for the Milwaukee Brewers.

== Career ==
=== Brewers ===
Miranda originally signed with the Brewers before the 1987 season. He worked his way up through their farm system until making his major league debut on June 5, 1993. After splitting the 1994 season between the major and minor leagues, he spent the entire 1995–96 seasons with the Brewers. He was released by the Brewers on June 17, 1997.

=== Minor leagues ===
After signing with the Cleveland Indians organization shortly thereafter, Miranda was released again, then signed by the Texas Rangers. He became a minor league free agent after the 1997 season, then pitched in the independent leagues for most of the next eight seasons, including a stint in the Mexican League in 2001.

=== Puerto Rico ===
Since 2008, Miranda has played and coached in the Federación de Béisbol Aficionado de Puerto Rico. In 2008, he played for the San Sebastián Patrulleros. In 2009, Miranda joined the Añasco Fundadores, first as a pitcher, then as manager. He returned to pitching action in April 2010 when he joined the Florida Titanes as a starting pitcher. In 2011, he served as pitching coach for the Camuy Arenas.
