= Edwin Núñez =

Puerto Rican baseball player (born 1963)

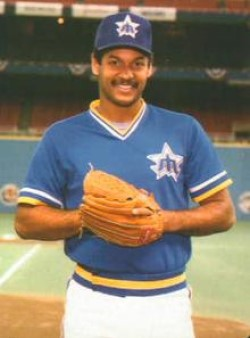
- Pitcher
- Born: May 27, 1963 (age 62); Humacao, Puerto Rico
- Batted: Right Threw: Right

MLB debut
- April 7, 1982, for the Seattle Mariners

Last MLB appearance
- May 16, 1994, for the Oakland Athletics

MLB statistics
- Win–loss record: 28–36
- Earned run average: 4.19
- Strikeouts: 508
- Saves: 54
- Stats at Baseball Reference

Teams
- Seattle Mariners (1982–1988); New York Mets (1988); Detroit Tigers (1989–1990); Milwaukee Brewers (1991–1992); Texas Rangers (1992); Oakland Athletics (1993–1994)

Edwin Núñez Martínez (born May 27, 1963) is a Puerto Rican former professional baseball pitcher. He played in Major League Baseball (MLB) for six different teams from 1982 to 1994; he spent 1982 to 1988 with the Seattle Mariners, his longest tenure with one team. He was the youngest player in the American League in 1982 and 1983.

== Pro career ==
In the spring of 1979, Núñez was signed by the Seattle Mariners as an undrafted amateur free agent and assigned to play for the Bellingham Mariners of the Northeast League. Playing on a team that included future MLB players Bud Black, Jim Presley, and former first round pick Al Chambers, Núñez posted a 4–1 record with a 2.08 ERA, and at the age of 16, was the youngest player on the roster. The next season, he was promoted to the Wausau Timbers, at a higher level of single A ball. With Wausau, Núñez posted his best record as a pro, going 16–3, with 205 strikeouts, a 2.47 E.R.A and 13 complete games.

In 1982, Núñez bypassed Double A completely and was promoted to Seattle's Triple A team, the Salt Lake City Gulls. Later that year he made his Major League debut, a relief appearance in which he allowed four runs in three innings of work, while striking out one batter and walking two in a 7–5 loss to the Minnesota Twins. For the next few seasons, Núñez split time between Triple A and the Major Leagues as the Mariners attempted to convert him from a starting pitcher into a reliever. In 1985, he finished with a 7–3 record and 16 saves, the most saves he would ever record in a Major League season.

In 1988, Seattle traded Núñez to the New York Mets in exchange for pitcher Gene Walter. He made just a handful of appearances for the Mets, as he would for the Detroit Tigers and Oakland A's. In May 1994, the A's released him and he never pitched in the major leagues again.

=== B.J. Surhoff incident ===
During an August 1993 double header between the A's and the Milwaukee Brewers, a bench-clearing brawl erupted in the second game. Núñez, who had been in the A's clubhouse, returned to the field and punched Brewers catcher B.J. Surhoff, leaving him with a bloody mouth that required stitches. Núñez said he was upset because Surhoff had shoved A's outfielder Scott Lydy. Núñez, who had pitched in the first game of the day, admitted he was wrong to have punched Surhoff.

== See also ==
- List of Major League Baseball players from Puerto Rico
- Best pitching seasons by a Detroit Tiger
