= Kurt Knudsen =

American baseball player (born 1967)

- Pitcher
- Born: February 20, 1967 (age 59); Arlington Heights, Illinois, U.S.
- Batted: Right Threw: Right

MLB debut
- May 16, 1992, for the Detroit Tigers

Last MLB appearance
- June 4, 1994, for the Detroit Tigers

MLB statistics
- Win–loss record: 6–5
- Earned run average: 5.07
- Strikeouts: 81
- Stats at Baseball Reference

Teams
- Detroit Tigers (1992–1994)

Kurt David Knudsen (born February 20, 1967) is an American former Major League Baseball pitcher. Knudsen played for the Detroit Tigers from 1992 to 1994.
