= Jeff Bronkey =

Afghan-American baseball player (born 1965)

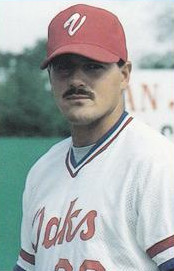
- Bronkey in 1988
- Pitcher
- Born: September 18, 1965 (age 60); Kabul, Kingdom of Afghanistan
- Batted: Right Threw: Right

MLB debut
- May 2, 1993, for the Texas Rangers

Last MLB appearance
- August 12, 1995, for the Milwaukee Brewers

MLB statistics
- Win–loss record: 2–2
- Earned run average: 4.04
- Strikeouts: 36
- Stats at Baseball Reference

Teams
- Texas Rangers (1993); Milwaukee Brewers (1994–1995)

Jacob Jeffery Bronkey (born September 18, 1965) is a former Major League Baseball pitcher who pitched with the Texas Rangers and Milwaukee Brewers. He attended Klamath Union High School in Klamath Falls, Oregon and became Player of the Year and won a state championship in 1983.

He was drafted by the Philadelphia Phillies in 1983, but instead attended Oklahoma State University. He was drafted by the Minnesota Twins organization in 1986. After his career, he pursued a college degree in psychology and his daughter Sierra was a softball player at the University of Arkansas from 2011 to 2015.

He is the only Major League player born in Afghanistan. He was born in Kabul to an American mother and Afghan father.
