= Bill Wertz =

American baseball player (born 1967)

- Relief pitcher
- Born: January 15, 1967 (age 59); Cleveland, Ohio, U.S.
- Batted: Right Threw: Right

MLB debut
- May 22, 1993, for the Cleveland Indians

Last MLB appearance
- May 26, 1994, for the Cleveland Indians

MLB statistics
- Win–loss record: 2–3
- Earned run average: 4.08
- Strikeouts: 54
- Stats at Baseball Reference

Teams
- Cleveland Indians (1993–1994)

William Charles Wertz (born January 15, 1967) is an American former Major League Baseball player. A pitcher, Wertz played for the Cleveland Indians in 1993 and 1994.

He played college baseball at Ohio State University.

He last played professional baseball in 1997 with the minor league Akron Aeros.
