= Ernest Riles =

American baseball player (born 1960)

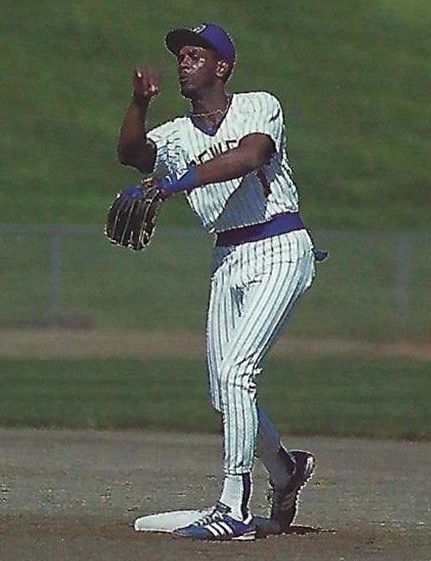
- Shortstop / Third baseman
- Born: October 2, 1960 (age 65); Cairo, Georgia, U.S.
- Batted: Left Threw: Right

MLB debut
- May 14, 1985, for the Milwaukee Brewers

Last MLB appearance
- October 3, 1993, for the Boston Red Sox

MLB statistics
- Batting average: .254
- Home runs: 48
- Runs batted in: 284
- Stats at Baseball Reference

Teams
- Milwaukee Brewers (1985–1988); San Francisco Giants (1988–1990); Oakland Athletics (1991); Houston Astros (1992); Boston Red Sox (1993)

Ernest Riles (born October 2, 1960) is an American former professional baseball shortstop and third baseman. From 1985 through 1993, Riles played for the Milwaukee Brewers (1985–1988), San Francisco Giants (1988–1990), Oakland Athletics (1991), Houston Astros (1992) and Boston Red Sox (1993) of the Major League Baseball (MLB). He batted left-handed and threw right-handed.

== Career ==
Riles grew up in Georgia, where he was the youngest child in a family of ten boys and one girl. He played baseball his entire life and idolized Bert Campaneris as a child. Riles attended Bainbridge High School in Bainbridge, Georgia, where he was coached by John Palermo.

Riles was signed by the Milwaukee Brewers from Middle Georgia College in the 1981 Major League Baseball draft. In 1983, he led the Texas League in batting average (.349), on-base percentage (.450) and OPS (.958), being promoted to Triple-A Pacific Coast League the next year.

Riles debuted with the Brewers in the 1985 mid-season. In his first major league stint, he hit .286 and finished third in the American League Rookie of the Year vote, behind Ozzie Guillén and teammate Teddy Higuera.

After frequent trips to the disabled list, Riles was traded from the Brewers to the San Francisco Giants for Jeffrey Leonard on June 8, 1988. The Giants were in need of infield roster depth at the time. He belted the 10,000th home run in Giants history during a 21–2 rout of the Cardinals. Riles played in the 1989 World Series as a member of the Giants. Riles started the first two games of the World Series as the Designated Hitter for the Giants.

Riles also played with Oakland and Houston, and ended his major league career with the Boston Red Sox in the 1993 season.

Over a nine-season major league career, Riles was a .254 hitter with 48 home runs and 284 run batted in in 919 games played.
