= Nate Minchey =

American baseball player (born 1969)

- Pitcher
- Born: August 31, 1969 (age 56); Austin, Texas, U.S.
- Batted: Right Threw: Right

Professional debut
- MLB: September 12, 1993, for the Boston Red Sox
- NPB: April 4, 1998, for the Hiroshima Toyo Carp

Last appearance
- MLB: September 25, 1997, for the Colorado Rockies
- NPB: June 19, 2004, for the Chiba Lotte Marines

MLB statistics
- Win–loss record: 3–7
- Earned run average: 6.75
- Strikeouts: 38

NPB statistics
- Win–loss record: 74–70
- Earned run average: 3.64
- Strikeouts: 626
- Stats at Baseball Reference

Teams
- Boston Red Sox (1993–1994, 1996); Colorado Rockies (1997); Hiroshima Toyo Carp (1998–2000); Chiba Lotte Marines (2001–2004)

Nathan Derek Minchey (born August 31, 1969) is an American former pitcher in Major League Baseball who played from 1993 through 1997 for the Boston Red Sox (1993–94, 1996) and Colorado Rockies (1997). He also played seven seasons in Japan, from 1998 until 2004, for the Hiroshima Toyo Carp (1998–2000) and Chiba Lotte Marines (2001–2004).

From 1987 through 1997, Minchey also pitched in the Montreal, Atlanta, Boston, St. Louis and Colorado minor league systems. He went 112–104 with 1141 strikeouts and a 3.54 ERA in 1832 2/3 innings, and posted identical records of 15–6 in 1992 and 1997. Overall, Minchey collected 189 wins in a span of 16 years.

Perhaps the most notable mark of Minchey's brief professional career occurred in his MLB debut with the Red Sox on September 12, 1993. Minchey pitched a complete game, yielding only one run and striking out five as Boston routed the Cleveland Indians by a score of 11-1. As of 2026, Minchey is one of only 196 pitchers to have pitched a complete game in their MLB debut. Minchey concluded his three-season MLB career with a 3–7 record, along with 38 strikeouts and a 6.75 ERA in 15 appearances, including 12 starts, one complete game, and 64.0 innings of work.

Following his majors career, Minchey played in Japan for seven seasons. He had a 74–70 record with 626 strikeouts and a 3.64 ERA in 1213 1/3 innings, collecting two 15-win seasons and leading the Japanese Pacific League with a 3.26 ERA in 2001. Minchey was the first foreign-born player to record double-digit win seasons in both of Japan's baseball leagues, and is also the NPB's fifth-winningest American pitcher in history

Following his career in Japan, Minchey worked for more than a decade as an international scout. As of 2026, he owns and manages a construction company in the Austin, Texas area.
