= 1993 Seattle Mariners season =

1993 Seattle Mariners
- League: American League
- Division: West
- Ballpark: Kingdome
- City: Seattle, Washington
- Record: 82–80 (.506)
- Divisional place: 4th
- Owners: Hiroshi Yamauchi (represented by John Ellis)
- General managers: Woody Woodward
- Managers: Lou Piniella
- Television: KSTW
- Radio: KIRO 710 AM (Dave Niehaus, Ken Levine, Chip Caray, Ron Fairly)

The 1993 Seattle Mariners season was their 17th since the franchise creation. The team ended the season finishing fourth in the American League West, finishing with a record of 82–80 (.506). It was the franchise's first full season under the ownership of Nintendo president Hiroshi Yamauchi, with team chairman John Ellis representing him. During the 1993 season, Randy Johnson set a club record with 308 strikeouts. It was also the first season he walked less than 100 batters.

The previous fall, the team also introduced a new logo, team colors and uniform set for this season that remain the team's current look to this day (with slight adjustments made in 2015).

== Offseason ==
- October 5, 1992: John Moses was released by the Seattle Mariners.
- October 14, 1992: The Mariners dismissed manager Bill Plummer, along with the entire coaching staff.
- November 10, 1992: The Mariners hire Lou Piniella as the team's new manager.
- November 17, 1992: Kevin Mitchell was traded by the Seattle Mariners to the Cincinnati Reds for Norm Charlton.
- November 28, 1992: David Ortiz was signed by the Seattle Mariners as an amateur free agent.
- December 23, 1992: Mackey Sasser was signed as a free agent with the Seattle Mariners.
- February 2, 1993: Henry Cotto was signed as a free agent with the Seattle Mariners.
- March 16, 1993: Mike Schooler was released by the Seattle Mariners.

== Regular season ==
=== Season standings ===
AL West
| Team | W | L | Pct. | GB | Home | Road |
|---|---|---|---|---|---|---|
| Chicago White Sox | 94 | 68 | .580 | — | 45‍–‍36 | 49‍–‍32 |
| Texas Rangers | 86 | 76 | .531 | 8 | 50‍–‍31 | 36‍–‍45 |
| Kansas City Royals | 84 | 78 | .519 | 10 | 43‍–‍38 | 41‍–‍40 |
| Seattle Mariners | 82 | 80 | .506 | 12 | 46‍–‍35 | 36‍–‍45 |
| California Angels | 71 | 91 | .438 | 23 | 44‍–‍37 | 27‍–‍54 |
| Minnesota Twins | 71 | 91 | .438 | 23 | 36‍–‍45 | 35‍–‍46 |
| Oakland Athletics | 68 | 94 | .420 | 26 | 38‍–‍43 | 30‍–‍51 |

=== Record vs. opponents ===
1993 American League record Source: MLB Standings Grid – 1993
| Team | BAL | BOS | CAL | CWS | CLE | DET | KC | MIL | MIN | NYY | OAK | SEA | TEX | TOR |
|---|---|---|---|---|---|---|---|---|---|---|---|---|---|---|
| Baltimore | — | 6–7 | 7–5 | 4–8 | 8–5 | 5–8 | 7–5 | 8–5 | 8–4 | 6–7 | 10–2 | 7–5 | 4–8 | 5–8 |
| Boston | 7–6 | — | 7–5 | 7–5 | 5–8 | 6–7 | 5–7 | 5–8 | 7–5 | 6–7 | 9–3 | 7–5 | 6–6 | 3–10 |
| California | 5–7 | 5–7 | — | 7–6 | 5–7 | 4–8 | 6–7 | 7–5 | 4–9 | 6–6 | 6–7 | 6–7 | 6–7 | 4–8 |
| Chicago | 8–4 | 5–7 | 6–7 | — | 9–3 | 7–5 | 6–7 | 9–3 | 10–3 | 4–8 | 7–6 | 9–4 | 8–5 | 6–6 |
| Cleveland | 5–8 | 8–5 | 7–5 | 3–9 | — | 6–7 | 7–5 | 8–5 | 4–8 | 6–7 | 8–4 | 3–9 | 7–5 | 4–9 |
| Detroit | 8–5 | 7–6 | 8–4 | 5–7 | 7–6 | — | 5–7 | 8–5 | 6–6 | 4–9 | 8–4 | 7–5 | 6–6 | 6–7 |
| Kansas City | 5–7 | 7–5 | 7–6 | 7–6 | 5–7 | 7–5 | — | 5–7 | 7–6 | 6–6 | 6–7 | 7–6 | 7–6 | 8–4 |
| Milwaukee | 5–8 | 8–5 | 5–7 | 3–9 | 5–8 | 5–8 | 7–5 | — | 7–5 | 4–9 | 7–5 | 4–8 | 4–8 | 5–8 |
| Minnesota | 4–8 | 5–7 | 9–4 | 3–10 | 8–4 | 6–6 | 6–7 | 5–7 | — | 4–8 | 8–5 | 4–9 | 7–6 | 2–10 |
| New York | 7–6 | 7–6 | 6–6 | 8–4 | 7–6 | 9–4 | 6–6 | 9–4 | 8–4 | — | 6–6 | 7–5 | 3–9 | 5–8 |
| Oakland | 2–10 | 3–9 | 7–6 | 6–7 | 4–8 | 4–8 | 7–6 | 5–7 | 5–8 | 6–6 | — | 9–4 | 5–8 | 5–7 |
| Seattle | 5–7 | 5–7 | 7–6 | 4–9 | 9–3 | 5–7 | 6–7 | 8–4 | 9–4 | 5–7 | 4–9 | — | 8–5 | 7–5 |
| Texas | 8–4 | 6–6 | 7–6 | 5–8 | 5–7 | 6–6 | 6–7 | 8–4 | 6–7 | 9–3 | 8–5 | 5–8 | — | 7–5 |
| Toronto | 8–5 | 10–3 | 8–4 | 6–6 | 9–4 | 7–6 | 4–8 | 8–5 | 10–2 | 8–5 | 7–5 | 5–7 | 5–7 | — |

=== Notable transactions ===
- May 14, 1993: Randy St. Claire was signed as a free agent with the Mariners.
- June 3, 1993: Alex Rodriguez was drafted by the Mariners with the first overall pick of the 1993 amateur draft. Player signed August 30, 1993.
- June 3, 1993: Matt Wise was drafted by the Seattle Mariners in the 54th round of the 1993 amateur draft, but did not sign.
- June 27, 1993: Dale Sveum was signed as a free agent.
- June 27, 1993: Henry Cotto was traded with Jeff Darwin to the Florida Marlins for Dave Magadan.
- July 21, 1993: Pete O'Brien was released to make room on the roster for Edgar Martínez.
- August 5, 1993: Randy St. Claire was released by the Mariners.

=== Roster ===
1993 Seattle Mariners
Roster
| Pitchers: 50 Bob Ayrault; 29 Chris Bosio; 37 Norm Charlton; 41 Jim Converse; 47 John Cummings; 55 Rich DeLucia; 35 Dave Fleming; 46 Mike Hampton; 39 Erik Hanson; 22,48 Dwayne Henry; 38 Brad Holman; 34,51 Randy Johnson; 50 Kevin King; 54 Tim Leary; 40 Jeff Nelson; 52 Steve Ontiveros; 34 Erik Plantenberg; 48 Dennis Powell; 42,48 Ted Power; 42 Roger Salkeld; 40 Zak Shinall; 17 Russ Swan; 26 Dave Wainhouse | Catchers: 33 Bill Haselman; 45 Chris Howard; 10 Dave Valle; Infielders: 8 Rich Amaral; 22 Wally Backman; 16 Mike Blowers; 5 Bret Boone; 18 Dave Magadan; 11 Edgar Martínez; 23 Tino Martinez; 9,12 Pete O'Brien; 20 Greg Pirkl; 6 Fernando Viña; 13 Omar Vizquel | Outfielders: 19 Jay Buhner; 28 Henry Cotto; 25 Mike Felder; 24 Ken Griffey Jr.; 44 Dann Howitt; 15 Greg Litton; 28 Marc Newfield; 4 Mackey Sasser; 40 Larry Sheets; 27 Lee Tinsley; 1 Brian Turang | Manager: 14 Lou Piniella; Coaches: 3 Lee Elia; 32 Sammy Ellis; 30 Ken Griffey; 7 John McLaren; 16 Sam Mejías; 2 Sam Perlozzo |

== Player stats ==
=== Batting ===
==== Starters by position ====
Note: Pos = Position; G = Games played; AB = At bats; H = Hits; Avg. = Batting average; HR = Home runs; RBI = Runs batted in

| Pos | Player | G | AB | H | Avg. | HR | RBI |
|---|---|---|---|---|---|---|---|
| C | Dave Valle | 135 | 423 | 109 | .258 | 13 | 63 |
| 1B | Tino Martinez | 109 | 408 | 108 | .265 | 17 | 60 |
| 2B | Bret Boone | 76 | 271 | 68 | .251 | 12 | 38 |
| SS | Omar Vizquel | 158 | 560 | 143 | .255 | 2 | 31 |
| 3B | Mike Blowers | 127 | 379 | 106 | .280 | 15 | 57 |
| LF | Mike Felder | 109 | 342 | 72 | .211 | 1 | 20 |
| CF | Ken Griffey Jr. | 156 | 582 | 180 | .309 | 45 | 109 |
| RF | Jay Buhner | 158 | 563 | 153 | .272 | 27 | 98 |
| DH | Pete O'Brien | 72 | 210 | 54 | .257 | 7 | 27 |

==== Other batters ====
Note: G = Games played; AB = At bats; H = Hits; Avg. = Batting average; HR = Home runs; RBI = Runs batted in

| Player | G | AB | H | Avg. | HR | RBI |
|---|---|---|---|---|---|---|
| Rich Amaral | 110 | 373 | 108 | .290 | 1 | 44 |
| Dave Magadan | 71 | 228 | 59 | .259 | 1 | 21 |
| Mackey Sasser | 83 | 188 | 41 | .218 | 1 | 21 |
| Greg Litton | 72 | 174 | 52 | .299 | 3 | 25 |
| Brian Turang | 40 | 140 | 35 | .250 | 0 | 7 |
| Bill Haselman | 58 | 137 | 35 | .255 | 5 | 16 |
| Edgar Martínez | 42 | 135 | 32 | .237 | 4 | 13 |
| Henry Cotto | 54 | 105 | 20 | .190 | 2 | 7 |
| Dann Howitt | 32 | 76 | 16 | .211 | 2 | 8 |
| Marc Newfield | 22 | 66 | 15 | .227 | 1 | 7 |
| Fernando Viña | 24 | 45 | 10 | .222 | 0 | 2 |
| Wally Backman | 10 | 29 | 4 | .138 | 0 | 0 |
| Greg Pirkl | 7 | 23 | 4 | .174 | 1 | 4 |
| Lee Tinsley | 11 | 19 | 3 | .158 | 1 | 2 |
| Larry Sheets | 11 | 17 | 2 | .118 | 0 | 1 |
| Chris Howard | 4 | 1 | 0 | .000 | 0 | 0 |

=== Pitching ===
| = Indicates league leader |

==== Starting pitchers ====
Note: G = Games pitched; IP = Innings pitched; W = Wins; L = Losses; ERA = Earned run average; SO = Strikeouts

| Player | G | IP | W | L | ERA | SO |
|---|---|---|---|---|---|---|
| Randy Johnson | 35 | 255.1 | 19 | 8 | 3.24 | 308 |
| Erik Hanson | 31 | 215.0 | 11 | 12 | 3.47 | 163 |
| Tim Leary | 33 | 169.1 | 11 | 9 | 5.05 | 68 |
| Dave Fleming | 26 | 167.1 | 12 | 5 | 4.36 | 75 |
| Chris Bosio | 29 | 164.1 | 9 | 9 | 3.45 | 119 |
| John Cummings | 10 | 46.1 | 0 | 6 | 6.02 | 19 |
| Jim Converse | 4 | 20.1 | 1 | 3 | 5.31 | 10 |

==== Other pitchers ====
Note: G = Games pitched; IP = Innings pitched; W = Wins; L = Losses; ERA = Earned run average; SO = Strikeouts

| Player | G | IP | W | L | ERA | SO |
|---|---|---|---|---|---|---|
| Mike Hampton | 13 | 17.0 | 1 | 3 | 9.53 | 8 |
| Roger Salkeld | 3 | 14.1 | 0 | 0 | 2.51 | 13 |

==== Relief pitchers ====
Note: G = Games pitched; W = Wins; L = Losses; SV = Saves; ERA = Earned run average; SO = Strikeouts

| Player | G | W | L | SV | ERA | SO |
|---|---|---|---|---|---|---|
| Norm Charlton | 34 | 1 | 3 | 18 | 2.34 | 48 |
| Jeff Nelson | 71 | 5 | 3 | 1 | 4.35 | 61 |
| Dennis Powell | 33 | 0 | 0 | 0 | 4.15 | 32 |
| Dwayne Henry | 31 | 2 | 1 | 2 | 6.67 | 35 |
| Rich DeLucia | 30 | 3 | 6 | 0 | 4.64 | 48 |
| Ted Power | 25 | 2 | 2 | 13 | 3.91 | 16 |
| Russ Swan | 23 | 3 | 3 | 0 | 9.15 | 10 |
| Erik Plantenberg | 20 | 0 | 0 | 1 | 6.52 | 3 |
| Brad Holman | 19 | 1 | 3 | 3 | 3.72 | 17 |
| Bob Ayrault | 14 | 1 | 1 | 0 | 3.20 | 7 |
| Steve Ontiveros | 14 | 0 | 2 | 0 | 1.00 | 13 |
| Kevin King | 13 | 0 | 1 | 0 | 6.17 | 8 |
| Dave Wainhouse | 3 | 0 | 0 | 0 | 27.00 | 2 |
| Zak Shinall | 1 | 0 | 0 | 0 | 3.38 | 0 |

== Awards and honors ==
- Randy Johnson, American League leader, Strikeouts
- Randy Johnson, Franchise Record, Most Strikeouts in one season

== Farm system ==
| Level | Team | League | Manager |
|---|---|---|---|
| AAA | Calgary Cannons | Pacific Coast League | Keith Bodie |
| AA | Jacksonville Suns | Southern League | Marc Hill |
| A | Riverside Pilots | California League | Dave Myers |
| A | Appleton Foxes | Midwest League | Carlos Lezcano |
| A-Short Season | Bellingham Mariners | Northwest League | Mike Goff |
| Rookie | AZL Mariners | Arizona League | Marty Martínez |
