= List of 1988 Seattle Mariners draft picks =

1988 Seattle Mariners draft picks
Tino Martinez (pictured) was the Mariners first round pick in 1988.
Information
Owners	George Argyros
General Manager(s)	Dick Balderson Woody Woodward
Manager(s)	Dick Williams Jim Snyder
First pick	Tino Martinez
Draft position	14th
Number of selections	52
Links
Results	Baseball-Reference
Official Site	The Official Site of the Seattle Mariners
Years	1987 • 1988 • 1989

The following is a list of 1988 Seattle Mariners draft picks. The Mariners took part in the June regular draft, also known as the Rule 4 draft. The Mariners made 52 selections in the 1988 draft, the first being first baseman Tino Martinez in the first round. In all, the Mariners selected 22 pitchers, 10 outfielders, 8 catchers, 3 shortstops, 3 third basemen, 2 first basemen, and 2 second basemen.

== Draft ==
=== Key ===
Round (Pick)	Indicates the round and pick the player was drafted
Position	Indicates the secondary/collegiate position at which the player was drafted, rather than the professional position the player may have gone on to play
**Bold**	Indicates the player signed with the Mariners
Italics	Indicates the player did not sign with the Mariners
*	Indicates the player made an appearance in Major League Baseball

=== Table ===
Round (Pick)	Name	Position	School	Source
1 (14)	**Tino Martinez**	First baseman	University of Tampa	
2 (44)	**Greg Pirkl**	Catcher	Los Alamitos High School	
3 (71)	**Jim Campanis**	Catcher	University of Southern California	
4 (97)	**Lee Hancock**	Left-handed pitcher	California Polytechnic State University	
5 (123)	**Willie Romay**	Outfielder	Miami High School	
6 (149)	**Kelvin Thomas**	Outfielder	M. B. Smiley High School	
7 (175)	**Julio Reyan**	Outfielder	Miami Southridge High School	
8 (201)	**Mike Smedes**	Right-handed pitcher	Laguna Hills High School	
9 (227)	Steve Chitren	Right-handed pitcher	Stanford University	
10 (253)	Ted Devore	Right-handed pitcher	University of Portland	
11 (279)	Ronnie Allen	Right-handed pitcher	Lake Washington High School	
12 (305)	**Nick Felix**	Left-handed pitcher	Texas A&M University	
13 (331)	**Jeff Darwin**	Right-handed pitcher	Alvin Community College	
14 (357)	**Mike Beiras**	Right-handed pitcher	Texas Tech University	
15 (383)	**Scott Taylor**	Right-handed pitcher	University of Kansas	
16 (409)	**Mark Razook**	Shortstop	California State University, Fullerton	
17 (435)	**James Kosnik**	Left-handed pitcher	Oakland Community College	
18 (461)	**Delvin Thomas**	Shortstop	M. B. Smiley High School	
19 (487)	James Clifford	First baseman	Ingraham High School	
20 (513)	**Tom Liss**	Left-handed pitcher	University of Detroit Mercy	
21 (539)	**Michael McLaughlin**	Shortstop	Glassboro State College	
22 (565)	**Jeff Miller**	Catcher	Normandale Community College	
23 (591)	**Joe White**	Right-handed pitcher	Mesa State College	
24 (617)	**Todd Krumm**	Outfielder	Michigan State University	
25 (643)	**Jim Price**	Right-handed pitcher	Stanford University	
26 (669)	**Jorge Robles**	Second baseman	University of Miami	
27 (695)	**Doug Davis**	First baseman	Grossmont College	
28 (721)	Scott Cline	Third baseman	University of California, Los Angeles	
29 (747)	**Kerry Woodson**	Right-handed pitcher	San Jose City College	
30 (773)	**Scott Bibee**	Right-handed pitcher	Carson High School	
31 (799)	Joel Wolfe	Third baseman	Chatsworth High School	
32 (825)	Dusty Madsen	Right-handed pitcher	Sacramento City College	
33 (851)	**Tim Stargell**	Second baseman	Southern University	
34 (877)	**Ben Burnau**	Left-handed pitcher	Miami University	
35 (903)	**Mike Cloutier**	Outfielder	University of Detroit Mercy	
36 (929)	**Mike Kerber**	Catcher	Canoga Park High School	
37 (955)	**Shawn Brown**	Outfielder	Granada Hills High School	
38 (981)	**John Kohli**	Left-handed pitcher	University of Nebraska–Lincoln	
39 (1006)	**Glen Raasch**	Catcher	Mt. San Antonio College	
40 (1031)	**Felix Gurruchaga**	Left-handed pitcher	Miami Dade College	
41 (1056)	**Chris Howard**	Catcher	University of Louisiana at Lafayette	
42 (1081)	Dean Haskins	Catcher	Montgomery High School	
43 (1106)	**Rob Callistro**	Right-handed pitcher	Concord High School	
44 (1130)	**Damian Torino**	Catcher	North Marion High School	
45 (1153)	**John Burton**	Right-handed pitcher	Mt. San Antonio College	
46 (1175)	**Tom Brock**	Outfielder	University of Michigan	
47 (1195)	Mark Ringkamp	Right-handed pitcher	Palomar College	
48 (1213)	Eddie Christian	Outfielder	Salesian High School	
49 (1231)	**Arthur Bass**	Outfielder	Westfield High School	
50 (1247)	**Daniel Donovan**	Right-handed pitcher	Brookdale Community College	
51 (1262)	**Keith Barrett**	Outfielder	California Polytechnic State University, Pomona	
52 (1276)	Brent Lutz	Third baseman	Issaquah High School	
