= List of 1990 Seattle Mariners draft picks =

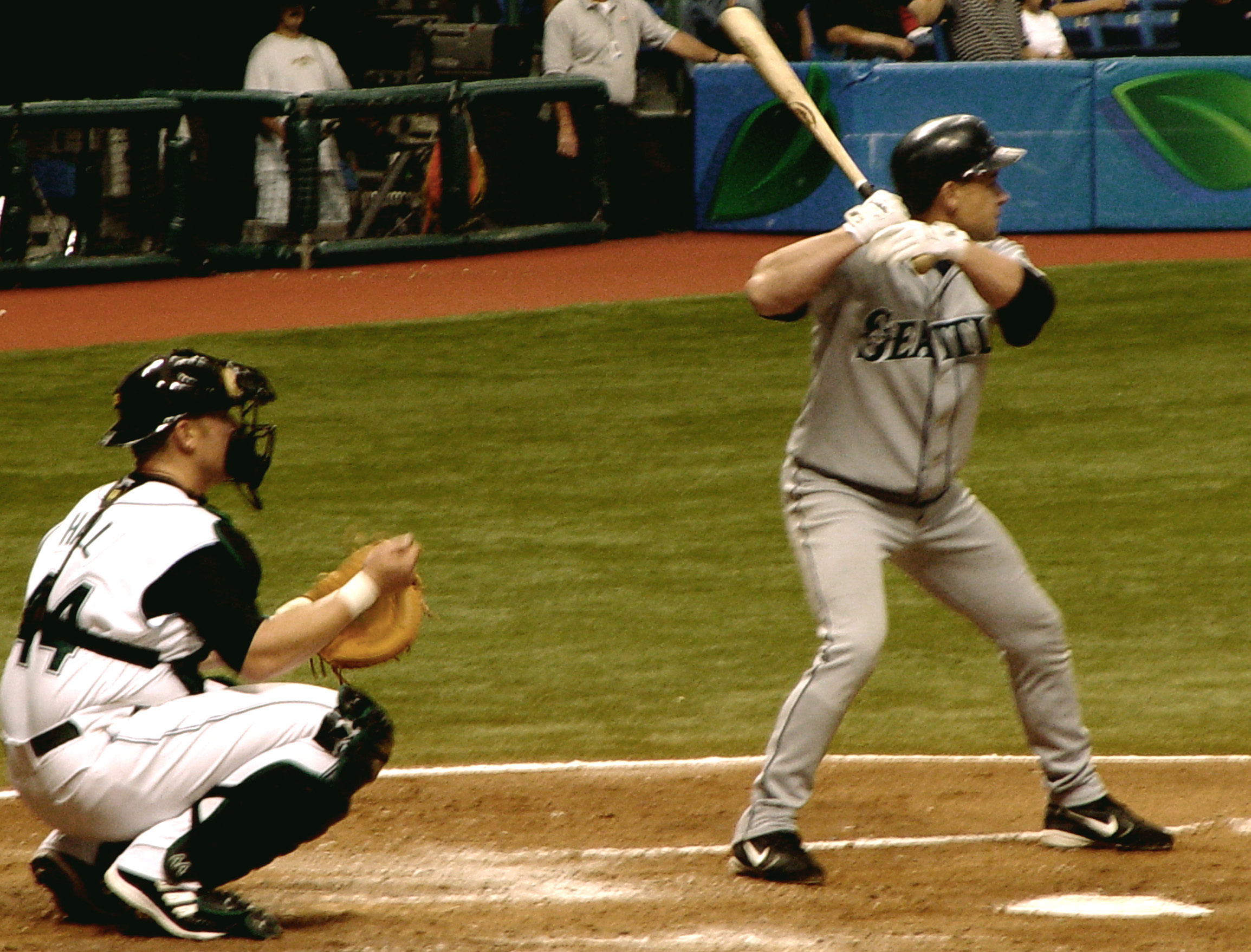
1990 Seattle Mariners draft picks
Bret Boone (pictured right) was the Mariners fifth-round pick in 1990.
Information
Owner	Jeff Smulyan
General Manager(s)	Woody Woodward
Manager(s)	Jim Lefebvre
First pick	Marc Newfield
Draft position	6th
Number of selections	75
Links
Results	Baseball-Reference
Official Site	The Official Site of the Seattle Mariners
Years	1989 • 1990 • 1991

The following is a list of 1990 Seattle Mariners draft picks. The Mariners took part in the June regular draft, also known as the Rule 4 draft. The Mariners made 75 selections in the 1990 draft, the first being first baseman Marc Newfield in the first round. In all, the Mariners selected 34 pitchers, 12 outfielders, 10 shortstops, 6 catchers, 6 first basemen, 4 third basemen, and 3 second basemen.

== Draft ==
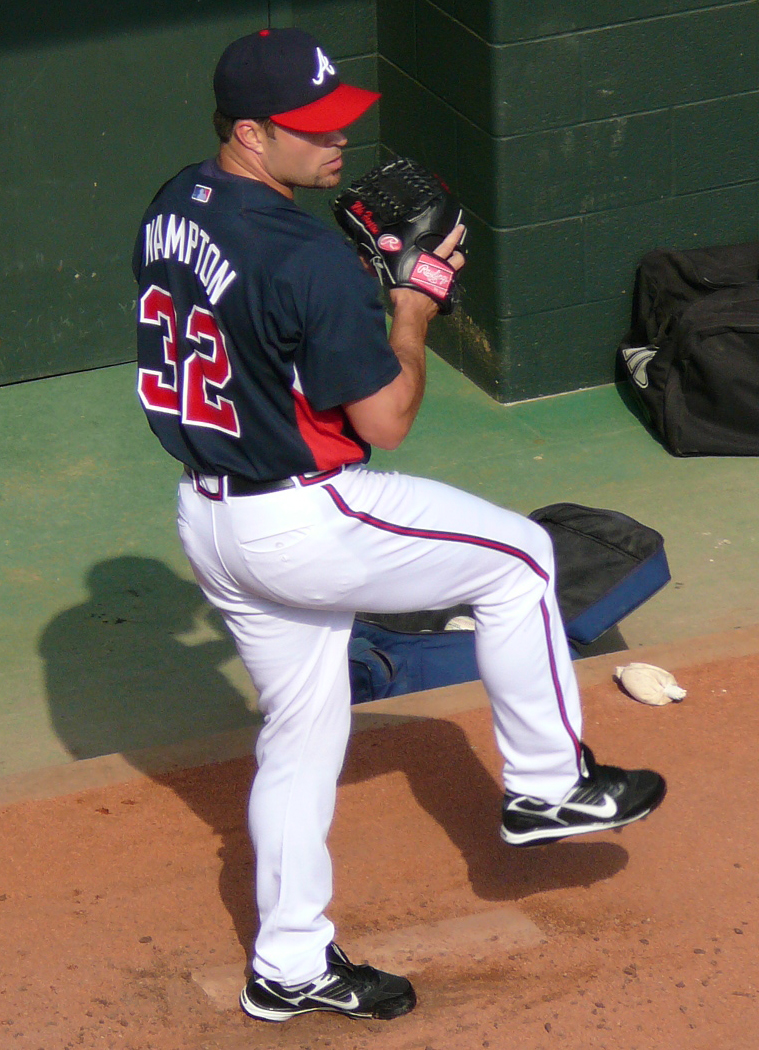
Mike Hampton was drafted by the Mariners in the sixth round of the 1990 draft.

=== Key ===
Round (Pick)	Indicates the round and pick the player was drafted
Position	Indicates the secondary/collegiate position at which the player was drafted, rather than the professional position the player may have gone on to play
**Bold**	Indicates the player signed with the Mariners
Italics	Indicates the player did not sign with the Mariners
*	Indicates the player made an appearance in Major League Baseball

=== Table ===
Round (Pick)	Name	Position	School	Source
1 (6)	**Marc Newfield**	First baseman	Marina High School	
1s (38)	**Tony Manahan**	Shortstop	Arizona State University	
3 (79)	**Dave Fleming**	Left-handed pitcher	University of Georgia	
4 (107)	**Paul Brannon**	Outfielder	Kings Mountain High School	
5 (134)	**Bret Boone**	Second baseman	University of Southern California	
6 (161)	**Mike Hampton**	Left-handed pitcher	Crystal River High School	
7 (188)	Kevin King	Left-handed pitcher	University of Oklahoma	
8 (215)	**John Cummings**	Left-handed pitcher	University of Southern California	
9 (242)	**David Lawson**	First baseman	West Covina High School	
10 (269)	**Reese Wallace**	Right-handed pitcher	Lufkin High School	
11 (296)	**Tommy Robertson**	Outfielder	Fairfield Central High School	
12 (323)	Luis Victoria	Right-handed pitcher	Isla Verde School	
13 (350)	**Kekoa Kaluhiokalani**	Right-handed pitcher	Waianae High School	
14 (377)	**Lipso Nava**	Shortstop	Miami Dade College	
15 (404)	**Scott Schanz**	Right-handed pitcher	University of California, Los Angeles	
16 (431)	**Jim Converse**	Right-handed pitcher	Casa Roble High School	
17 (458)	**Richard Russell**	Right-handed pitcher	Campbell University	
18 (485)	**David Adam**	Right-handed pitcher	Central Connecticut State University	
19 (512)	Albie Lopez	Right-handed pitcher	Mesa Community College	
20 (538)	**Jim Neugent**	Left-handed pitcher	Mustang High School	
21 (564)	**Tony Kounas**	Outfielder	Loyola Marymount University	
22 (590)	Pat Bojcun	Right-handed pitcher	Central Michigan University	
23 (616)	**Greg Hunter**	Second baseman	Washington State University	
24 (642)	**Willie Wilder**	Outfielder	Murray State University	
25 (668)	**Douglas Fitzer**	Left-handed pitcher	University of Detroit Mercy	
26 (694)	Jeff Tucker	Right-handed pitcher	Allen Community College	
27 (720)	**Christopher Terry**	Shortstop	Tokay High School	
28 (746)	Brad Gay	Catcher	Dixie M. Hollins High School	
29 (772)	**David McDonald**	Left-handed pitcher	Brandeis University	
30 (798)	**Renaldo Bullock**	Outfielder	Triton College	
31 (824)	**Damon Bihm**	Outfielder	University High School	
32 (850)	Ron Rico	First baseman	Cerritos College	
33 (876)	**Dion Gargagriano**	Left-handed pitcher	County College of Morris	
34 (902)	**Michael Bond**	Shortstop	Allegany College of Maryland	
35 (928)	**Clay Klavitter**	Third baseman	Glendale Community College	
36 (954)	**Salvy Urso**	Left-handed pitcher	Henry B. Plant High School	
37 (980)	**Alfred Rivers**	Outfielder	Tallassee High School	
38 (1005)	**Miguel Nolasco**	Shortstop	Lely High School	
39 (1029)	**Kenny Williams**	Right-handed pitcher	Elk Grove High School	
40 (1053)	**Bernard Erhard**	Shortstop	Spartanburg Methodist College	
41 (1076)	Gary Miller	Right-handed pitcher	Pennsylvania State University	
42 (1098)	Armando Morales	Right-handed pitcher	Indian Hills Community College	
43 (1120)	**Anthony Maisano**	First baseman	Georgia Institute of Technology	
44 (1142)	**Michael Gilmore**	Outfielder	Broomfield High School	
45 (1164)	Brian Fontes	Right-handed pitcher	Fresno City College	
46 (1184)	**Charles Wiley**	Right-handed pitcher	Johnson County Community College	
47 (1203)	**Scott Bedford**	Catcher	Edmonds Community College	
48 (1222)	Rodney Mazion	Shortstop	Hillsborough High School	
49 (1241)	George Glinatsis	Right-handed pitcher	University of Cincinnati	
50 (1260)	**Richard Wrobel**	Outfielder	Upland High School	
51 (1278)	**Daniel Stanley**	Shortstop	Yakima Valley Community College	
52 (1296)	**Jon Halland**	Second baseman	Arizona State University	
53 (1314)	Brian Klomp	Right-handed pitcher	McLane High School	
54 (1331)	**Rob Nichols**	First baseman	Washington State University	
55 (1347)	**Roger Johnson**	Catcher	San Pedro High School	
56 (1361)	**Eddie Miller**	Right-handed pitcher	El Camino College Compton Center	
57 (1373)	**Dennis Shrum**	Third baseman	Bullard High School	
58 (1383)	**James Bonnici**	Shortstop	Rochester Adams High School	
59 (1392)	Robert Lewis	Catcher	Los Angeles Harbor College	
60 (1401)	**Marcus Drake**	Outfielder	Arroyo Grande High School	
61 (1409)	**Ron Stanford**	Right-handed pitcher	Crisp County High School	
62 (1415)	**Hector Hernandez**	Right-handed pitcher	Colegio Bautista	
63 (1421)	**Thomas Borio**	Right-handed pitcher	Plainville High School	
64 (1427)	Brandon Newell	Third baseman	Nooksack Valley High School	
65 (1431)	Matthew Pontbriant	Left-handed pitcher	Saint Bernard School	
66 (1435)	**Bryan Londberg**	Right-handed pitcher	Glendale Community College	
67 (1439)	**Silas Grinstead**	Catcher	Cardinal Newman High School	
68 (1443)	Tim Comish	Outfielder	Adolfo Camarillo High School	
69 (1446)	**Keith Tippett**	Shortstop	Indian River State College	
70 (1449)	**Dan Ricabal**	Right-handed pitcher	San Gabriel High School	
71 (1452)	Shawn Sanderfer	Third baseman	Upland High School	
72 (1455)	Toraino Golston	Outfielder	Gateway High School	
73 (1458)	Craig Gienger	First baseman	Otero Junior College	
74 (1461)	**Michael Bruce**	Catcher	Canoga Park High School	
75 (1464)	**Tim Roberts**	Left-handed pitcher	Duke University	
