= Shane Ray =

American gridiron football player (born 1993)

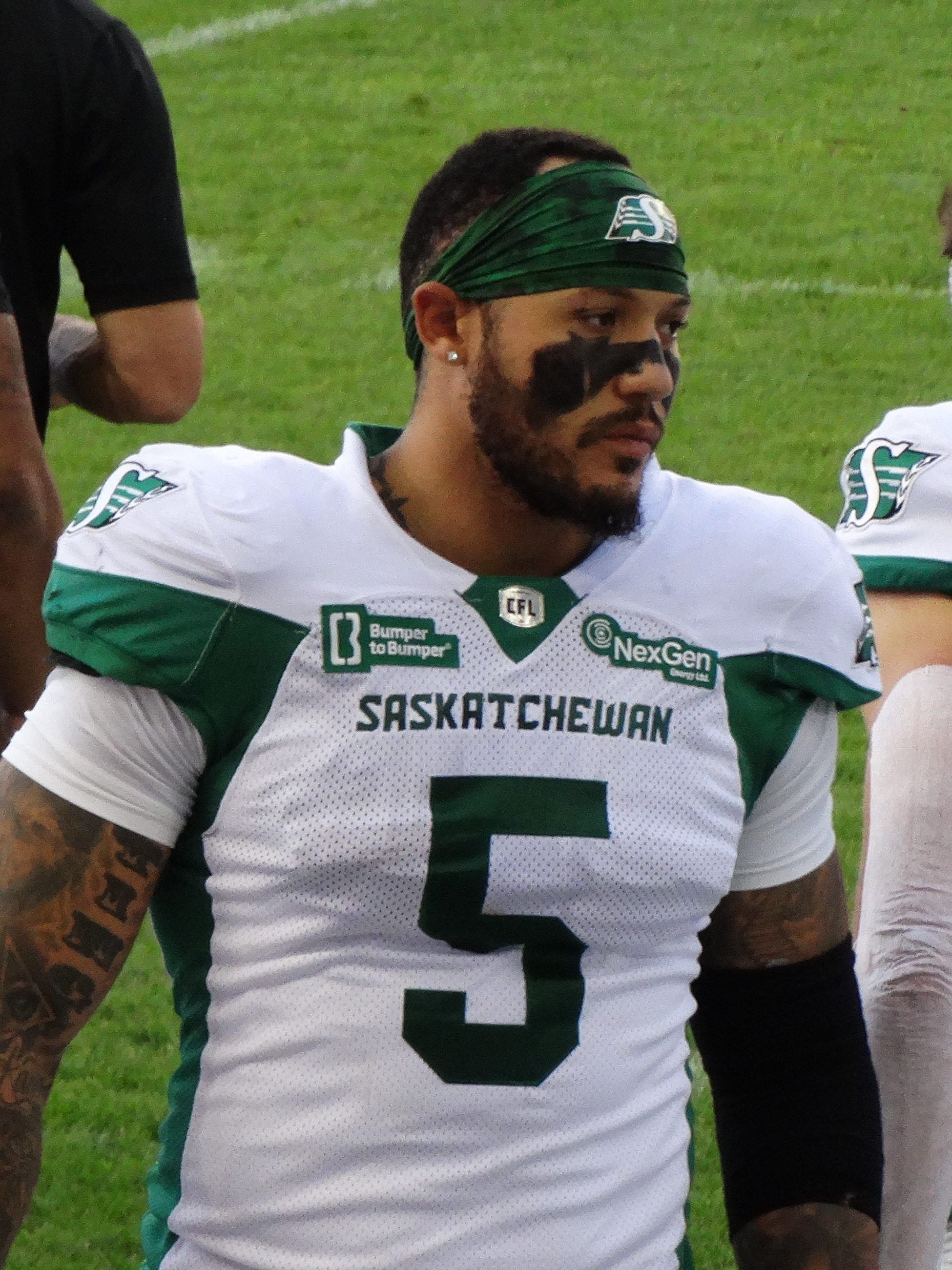
- Ray with the Saskatchewan Roughriders in 2025

Profile
- Position: Defensive lineman

Personal information
- Born: May 18, 1993 (age 33); Kansas City, Missouri, U.S.
- Listed height: 6 ft 3 in (1.91 m)
- Listed weight: 245 lb (111 kg)

Career information
- High school: Bishop Miege (Roeland Park, Kansas)
- College: Missouri (2011–2014)
- NFL draft: 2015: 1st round, 23rd overall pick

Career history
- Denver Broncos (2015–2018); Baltimore Ravens (2019)*; Toronto Argonauts (2021–2022); Buffalo Bills (2023)*; Tennessee Titans (2024)*; Saskatchewan Roughriders (2025)
- * Offseason or practice squad member only

Awards and highlights
- Super Bowl champion (50); 2× Grey Cup champion (2022, 2025); Unanimous All-American (2014); SEC Defensive Player of the Year (2014); First-team All-SEC (2014)

Career NFL statistics
- Total tackles: 94
- Sacks: 14
- Forced fumbles: 2
- Fumble recoveries: 2
- Defensive touchdowns: 1
- Stats at Pro Football Reference
- Stats at CFL.ca

Shane Michael Ray (born May 18, 1993) is an American professional football defensive lineman. He played college football at Missouri, where he was recognized as a unanimous All-American. He was selected by the Denver Broncos in the first round of the 2015 NFL draft. Ray has won one Super Bowl and two Grey Cups.

== Early life ==
Ray attended Bishop Miege High School in Roeland Park, Kansas, where he played football and competed in track. In football, he earned first-team all-state honors as a senior after totaling 100 tackles, including 16 tackles for loss, 10.5 sacks, three forced fumbles. In track & field, Ray competed in the throwing events. At the 2010 Baker Relays, he took gold in the shot put event with a throw of 14.60 meters (47 ft 9 in).

Considered a three-star recruit by Rivals.com, he was rated as the 17th best weakside defensive end prospect of his class. After being shown interest by programs such as Notre Dame, Kansas and Wisconsin, he ultimately decided to accept a scholarship to Missouri.

== College career ==
After redshirting in his first season, he made 16 tackles, including 2.5 for loss, in 12 games as a backup defensive end for the Tigers. In 2013, played in all 14 games, recording 39 tackles, including nine for loss, and 4.5 sacks despite backing up Kony Ealy and Michael Sam. In 2014, he began to emerge as one of the premier pass rushers in the Southeastern Conference (SEC). Through the first five games of the season, he set a new career high in tackles for loss (11) and sacks (8). In the 2014 SEC Championship Game, he was ejected from the game after targeting Alabama quarterback Blake Sims after throwing for what turned out to be a 58-yard touchdown to DeAndrew White. He cooled off towards the end of the season, but he still finished with 65 tackles, 22.5 tackles-for-loss and 14.5 sacks, breaking the record of 11.5 that was owned by both Michael Sam and Aldon Smith. Following the season, he was named a unanimous All-American and the SEC Defensive Player of the Year.

After his junior season, Ray entered the 2015 NFL draft.

== Professional career ==
=== Pre-draft ===
Pre-draft measurables
Height	Weight	Arm length	Hand span	Bench press
6 ft 2 5/8 in (1.90 m)	245 lb (111 kg)	33 1/8 in (0.84 m)	9 in (0.23 m)	21 reps
All values from NFL Combine

Ray was prevented from participating in drills at the NFL Combine due to a foot injury similar to turf toe that he obtained during the 2015 Citrus Bowl, however many doctors said surgery is not needed. On April 27, 2015, days before the 2015 NFL Draft, he was cited for possession of marijuana.

=== Denver Broncos ===
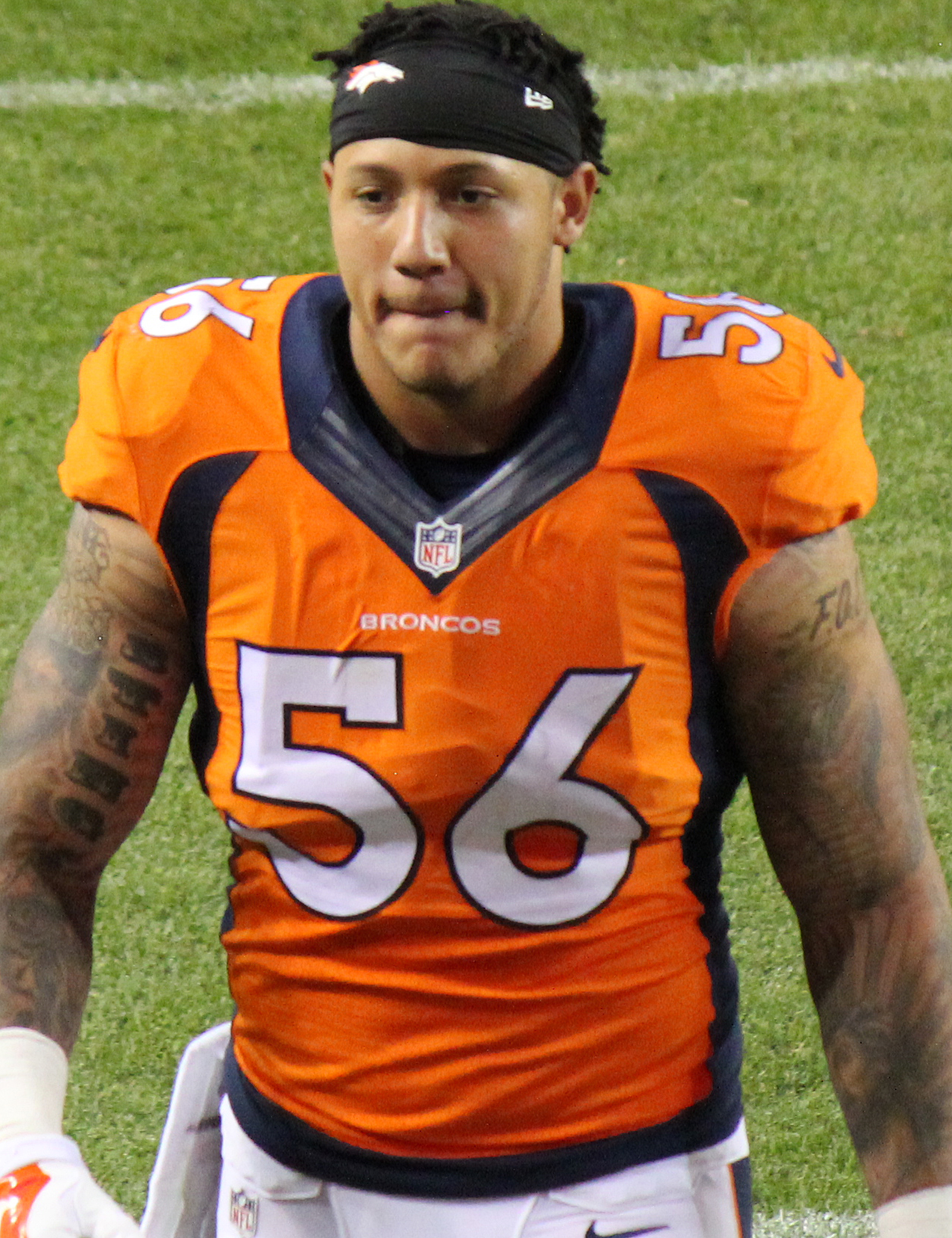
Ray with the Denver Broncos in 2015

Ray was a potential top ten draft pick until he was cited for marijuana possession. On April 30, 2015, Ray was selected by the Denver Broncos with the 23rd overall pick in the first round of the 2015 NFL draft. Originally holding the 28th pick, Denver traded Manny Ramirez, along with two of their fifth-round selections to the Detroit Lions to move up 5 spots. Ray ended his rookie season with 20 tackles, four sacks, and one pass deflection.

Ray was on the Broncos when they won the Super Bowl on February 7, 2016, defeating the Carolina Panthers 24–10 in Super Bowl 50. Ray came off the bench and had two tackles and a forced fumble in the game.

On September 18, 2016, Ray scored his first career touchdown after a forced fumble was caused by Von Miller to seal a Broncos victory against the Indianapolis Colts by a score of 34–20. On September 25, 2016, Ray recorded a career-high three sacks in a 29–17 victory against the Cincinnati Bengals to help the Broncos improve to 3–0.

On July 28, 2017, it was revealed that Ray had suffered a torn ligament in his wrist, which ruled him out for six to eight weeks. He was placed on injured reserve on September 4, 2017, making him eligible to return in 2017. He was activated off injured reserve on October 30 for the team's Week 8 matchup against the Chiefs. He was placed back on injured reserve on December 19, 2017 after having his third wrist surgery.

On May 2, 2018, the Broncos declined Ray's fifth-year option. On June 6, 2018, it was reported that Ray would require another wrist surgery that would sideline him for at least three months.

=== Baltimore Ravens ===
On May 17, 2019, Ray signed with the Baltimore Ravens. He was released during final roster cuts on August 30, 2019.

=== Toronto Argonauts ===
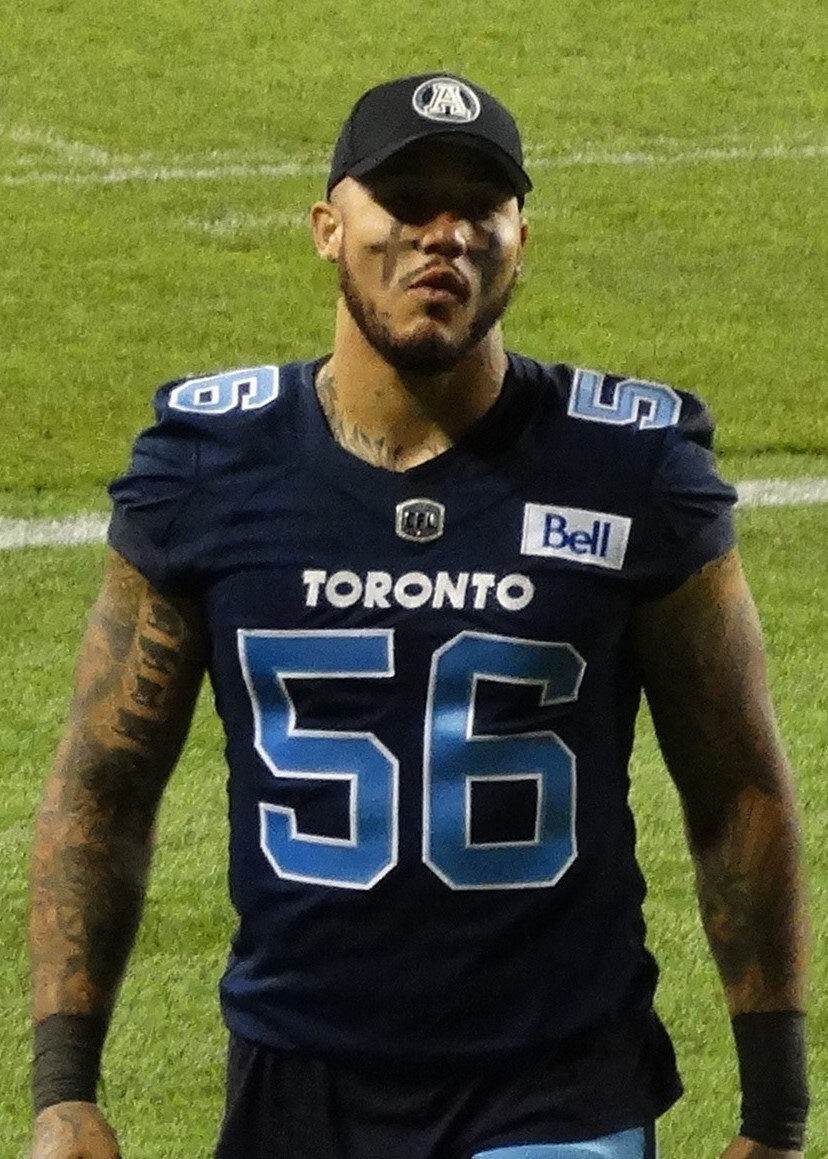
Ray with the Toronto Argonauts in 2021

On February 6, 2021, Ray signed with the Toronto Argonauts of the Canadian Football League. Over two seasons, he dressed for 18 games where he recorded 17 defensive tackles, six sacks, and two forced fumbles. In 2023, Ray suffered a torn bicep late in the season and was on the injured list when the team won the 109th Grey Cup championship. He became a free agent upon the expiration of his contract on February 14, 2023.

=== Buffalo Bills ===
On May 12, 2023, Ray was invited to the Bills' minicamp for a tryout, and was later signed to a deal, reuniting with former Broncos teammate Von Miller. He was placed on injured reserve on August 21, 2023. He was released on August 26, 2023.

=== Tennessee Titans ===
On July 25, 2024, Ray signed with the Tennessee Titans. He was released on August 27.

=== Saskatchewan Roughriders ===
On January 27, 2025, Ray signed with the Saskatchewan Roughriders, making his return to the CFL. He became a free agent after the 2025 season.

=== NFL career statistics ===
Year	Team	Games		Tackles					Interceptions					Fumbles			
Year	Team	G	GS	Comb	Solo	Ast	Sack	Sfty	Int	Yds	Lng	TD	PD	FF	FR	Yds	TD
2015	DEN	14	0	20	15	5	4.0	0	0	0	0	0	1	0	0	0	0
2016	DEN	16	8	48	33	15	8.0	0	0	0	0	0	0	1	2	18	1
2017	DEN	8	7	16	10	6	1.0	0	0	0	0	0	0	0	0	0	0
2018	DEN	11	0	10	6	4	1.0	0	0	0	0	0	1	1	0	0	0
Career		49	15	94	64	30	14.0	0	0	0	0	0	2	2	2	18	1

== Personal life ==
Shane's father, Wendell Ray, lettered at Missouri from 1978 to 1980 at the linebacker position and was a fifth-round draft pick in the 1981 NFL draft by the Minnesota Vikings, but never played a regular-season game in the NFL. In an interview with Bleacher Report, Shane states that he and his mother were "trying to make it off food stamps".
