= List of 1987 Seattle Mariners draft picks =

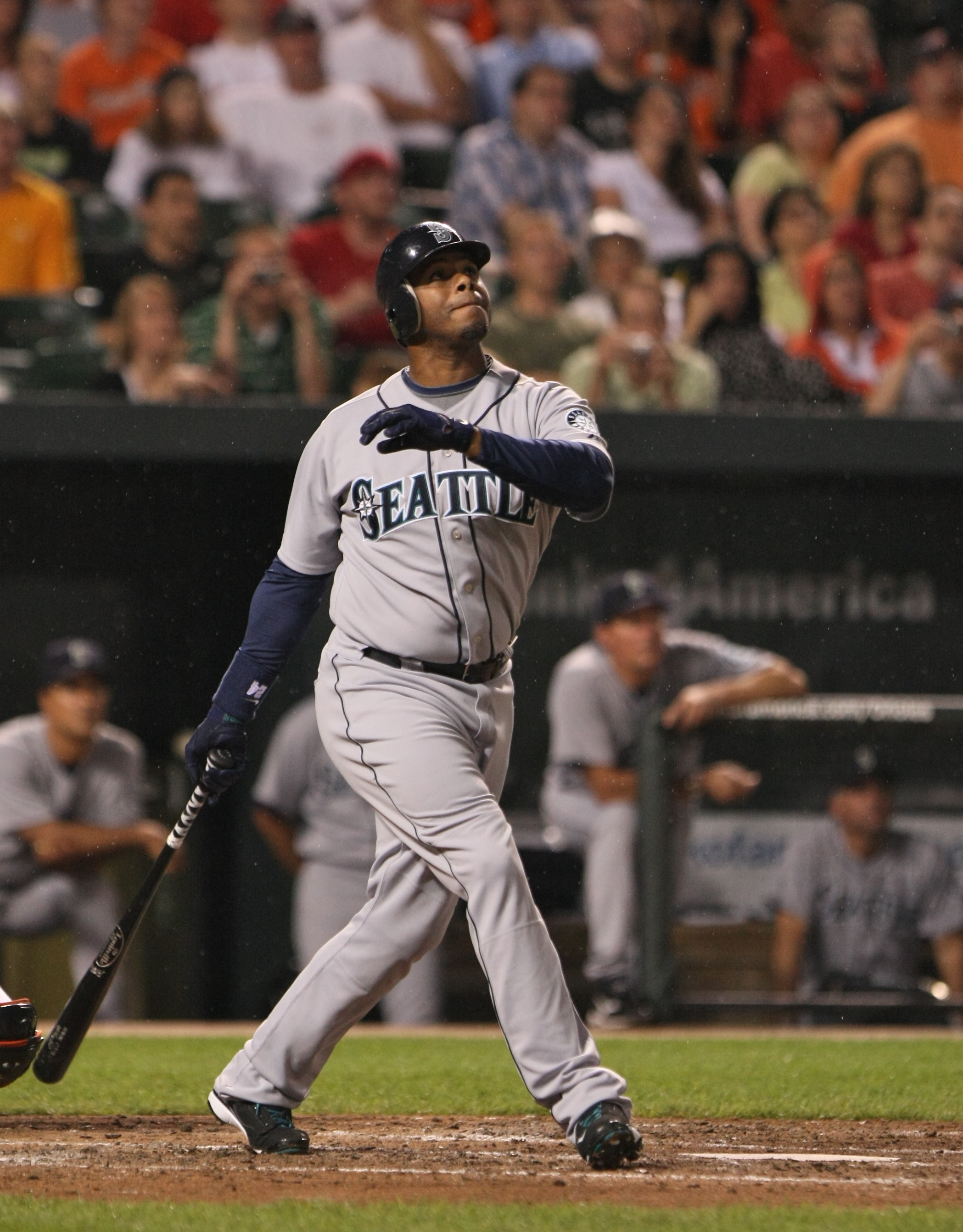
1987 Seattle Mariners draft picks
Ken Griffey Jr. (pictured) was the Mariners first round pick in 1987.
Information
Owners	George Argyros
General Manager(s)	Dick Balderson
Manager(s)	Dick Williams
First pick	Ken Griffey Jr.
Draft position	1st
Number of selections	55
Links
Results	Baseball-Reference
Official Site	The Official Site of the Seattle Mariners
Years	1986 • 1987 • 1988

The following is a list of 1987 Seattle Mariners draft picks. The Mariners took part in the June regular draft, also known as the Rule 4 draft. The Mariners made 55 selections in the 1987 draft, the first being outfielder Ken Griffey Jr. in the first round. In all, the Mariners selected 29 pitchers, 11 outfielders, 4 shortstops, 3 catchers, 3 first baseman, 3 second basemen, and 2 third basemen.

== Draft ==
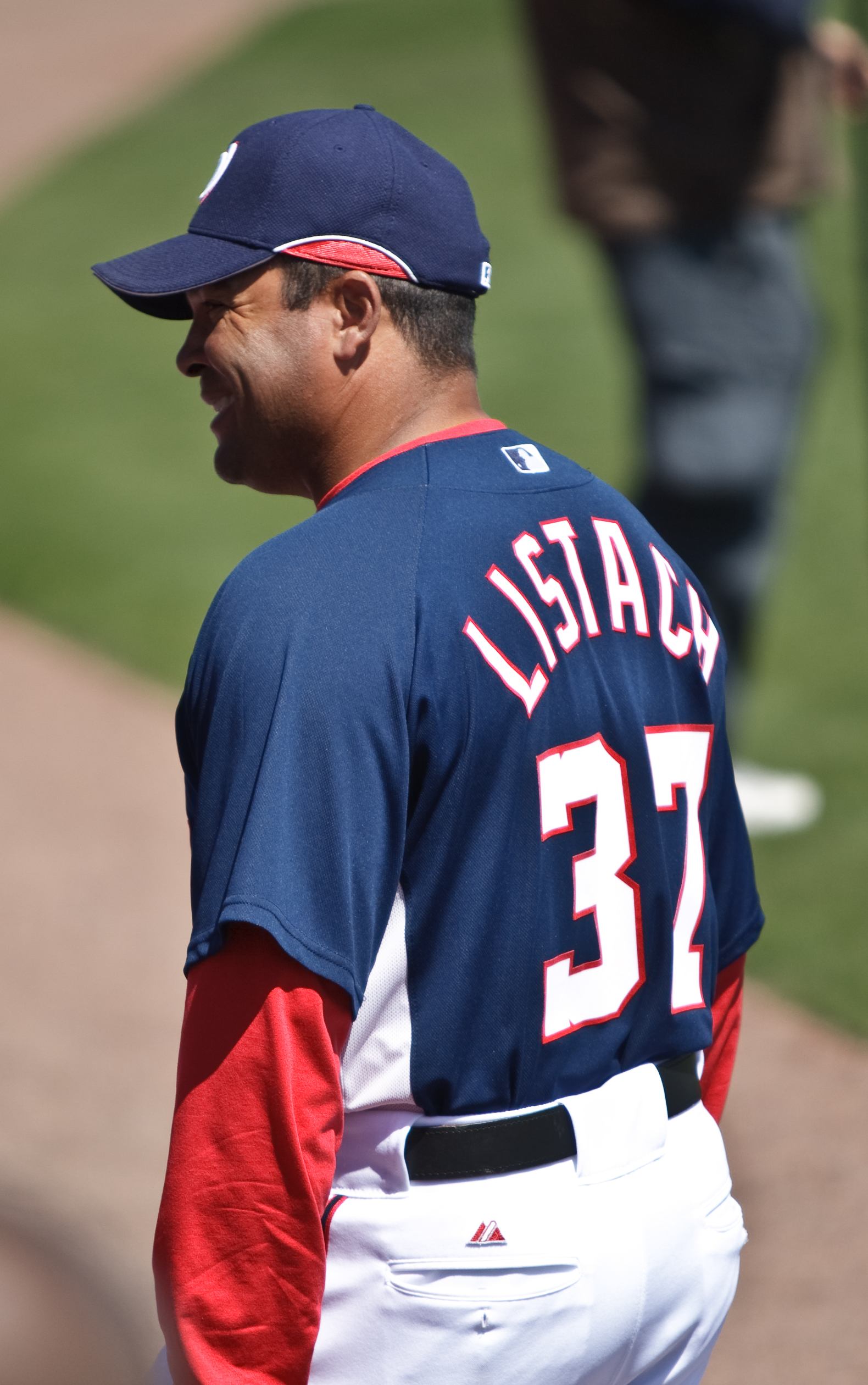
Pat Listach was selected by the Mariners in the 23rd round of the 1987 draft.

=== Key ===
Round (Pick)	Indicates the round and pick the player was drafted
Position	Indicates the secondary/collegiate position at which the player was drafted, rather than the professional position the player may have gone on to play
**Bold**	Indicates the player signed with the Mariners
Italics	Indicates the player did not sign with the Mariners
*	Indicates the player made an appearance in Major League Baseball

=== Table ===
Round (Pick)	Name	Position	School	Source
1 (1)	**Ken Griffey Jr.**	Outfielder	Moeller High School	
2 (33)	**Dave Burba**	Right-handed pitcher	Ohio State University	
3 (59)	**Mike Goff**	Right-handed pitcher	California State University, Fresno	
4 (85)	Richard Lantrip	Shortstop	Golden West High School	
5 (111)	**Brian Wilkinson**	Right-handed pitcher	Cherry Creek High School	
6 (137)	Joe Slusarski	Right-handed pitcher	University of New Orleans	
7 (163)	**Mike McGuire**	Right-handed pitcher	Sweeny High School	
8 (189)	Eric Helfand	Catcher	Patrick Henry High School	
9 (215)	**Ted Eldredge**	Right-handed pitcher	University of California, Berkeley	
10 (241)	Emmanuel Spann	Third baseman	Tulane University	
11 (267)	Bob Bretwisch	Left-handed pitcher	Bradley University	
12 (293)	**Brian Baldwin**	Right-handed pitcher	Northeastern University	
13 (319)	Jim Foley	Right-handed pitcher	Orange Coast College	
14 (345)	**Keith Helton**	Left-handed pitcher	University of Arkansas	
15 (371)	**Charlie Webb**	Left-handed pitcher	California State Polytechnic University, Pomona	
16 (397)	**Corey Paul**	Outfielder	Belmont High School	
17 (423)	**Ellerton Maynard**	Outfielder	Miami Dade College	
18 (449)	**Mike Gardiner**	Right-handed pitcher	Indiana State University	
19 (475)	**Dorian Daughtry**	Outfielder	Kingsborough Community College	
20 (501)	**Mike Sisco**	Shortstop	University of Arkansas	
21 (527)	**Daryl Burrus**	Third baseman	Locke High School	
22 (553)	**Kevin Reichardt**	Second baseman	University of Wisconsin–Oshkosh	
23 (579)	Pat Listach	Shortstop	McLennan Community College	
24 (605)	**Greg Burlingame**	Left-handed pitcher	University of Hawaiʻi at Mānoa	
25 (631)	**Otis Patrick**	Outfielder	Edmonds Community College	
26 (657)	**Anthony Gordon**	Left-handed pitcher	Avon Park High School	
27 (686)	Randy Rivera	Right-handed pitcher	Ranger College	
28 (709)	**Tony Cayson**	Outfielder	Forest High School	
29 (735)	Brian Cisarik	Outfielder	University of Texas at Austin	
30 (761)	**Gary Cameron**	Left-handed pitcher	Utah Technical College	
31 (787)	Keith Barrett	Outfielder	California State Polytechnic University, Pomona	
32 (813)	**Ranfred Johnson**	Right-handed pitcher	El Camino College	
33 (838)	**Justin Mitton**	Shortstop	Trevor G. Browne High School	
34 (863)	**Scott Pitcher**	Right-handed pitcher	Hillsborough Community College	
35 (888)	**Steve Hisey**	Outfielder	University of California, Los Angeles	
36 (912)	**Jeff Hooper**	Catcher	Washington State University	
37 (935)	**Erick Bryant**	Right-handed pitcher	California State University, Los Angeles	
38 (958)	**Todd Haney**	Second baseman	University of Texas at Austin	
39 (980)	**Scott Stoerck**	Right-handed pitcher	Orange Coast College	
40 (1001)	**Steve Bieksha**	Right-handed pitcher	University of Massachusetts Lowell	
41 (1022)	**John Hoffman**	Catcher	Ballard High School	
42 (1041)	Gar Finnvold	Right-handed pitcher	Palm Beach State College	
43 (1059)	**Tom Peters**	Right-handed pitcher	Santa Monica College	
44 (1076)	**Jeff Brouelette**	Second baseman	Orange Coast College	
45 (1093)	**Emmitt Cohick**	Outfielder	Fullerton College	
46 (1109)	Jeff Darwin	Right-handed pitcher	Bonham High School	
47 (1125)	**Corey Thomas**	Right-handed pitcher	Pinole Valley High School	
48 (1140)	**Florentino Lozano**	Outfielder	Palomar College	
49 (1154)	**Keith Mays**	Right-handed pitcher	Bassett High School	
50 (1167)	John Burton	Right-handed pitcher	Bonita High School	
51 (1179)	**Ruben Gonzales**	First baseman	Pepperdine University	
52 (1190)	James Hurst	Left-handed pitcher	South Florida Community College	
53 (1198)	David Boss	Right-handed pitcher	San Jose City College	
54 (1205)	**Jeff Keitges**	First baseman	American River College	
55 (1211)	**Jeff Morrison**	First baseman	Chapman University	
