= Travis Releford =

American basketball player (born 1990)

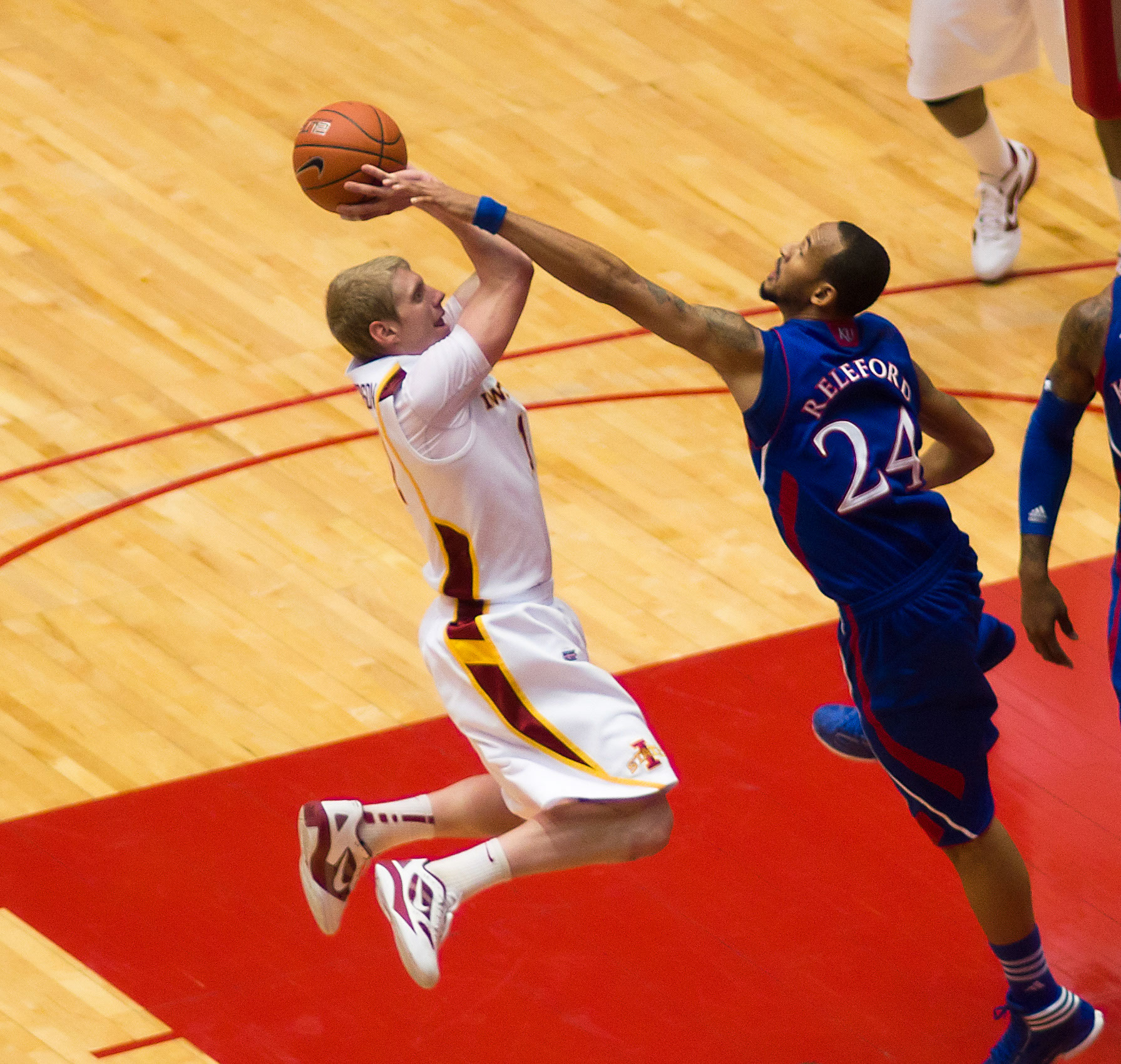
- Releford (right) defending against Scott Christopherson of Iowa State

AEK Larnaca
- Position: Shooting guard
- League: Cypriot Division A

Personal information
- Born: February 22, 1990 (age 36) Kansas City, Missouri, U.S.
- Listed height: 6 ft 6 in (1.98 m)
- Listed weight: 205 lb (93 kg)

Career information
- High school: Bishop Miege (Roeland Park, Kansas)
- College: Kansas (2008–2013)
- NBA draft: 2013: undrafted
- Playing career: 2013–present

Career history
- 2013–2014: Okapi Aalstar
- 2014–2015: Mississauga Power
- 2015: Maccabi Kiryat Gat
- 2015–2016: Idaho Stampede
- 2016: Helsinki Seagulls
- 2016: Niagara River Lions
- 2016–2017: Siarka Tarnobrzeg
- 2017: Wilki Morskie Szczecin
- 2017–2018: Limburg United
- 2018–present: AEK Larnaca

Career highlights
- Second-team All-Big 12 (2013); Big 12 All-Defensive Team (2013)
- Stats at Basketball Reference
Medals
Men's basketball
Representing the United States
FIBA Americas U-18 Championship
Silver medal – second place	2008 Argentina	Team

Travis Releford (born February 22, 1990) is an American professional basketball player for AEK Larnaca of the Cypriot Division A. He played college basketball at the University of Kansas and has previously represented the United States at the international level.

== High school career ==
Releford attended Bishop Miege where he was a two-time high school All-American. As a senior, he averaged 24.1 points, 6.0 rebounds and 4.0 assists, earning the Eastern Kansas League (EKL) and Gatorade Player of the Year after guiding the Stags to a 19–3 record.

== College career ==
After graduating, Releford attended the University of Kansas where he was a starter his junior and senior seasons. In five seasons at Kansas, he won five Big 12 regular-season titles, three league tournament titles, advanced to four Sweet 16s, two Elite Eights, one Final Four and was 158–27 with KU. He ended his college career with 965 points and ranked 10th all-time in games played (138) and tied for 27th in steals (114) in school history.

== Professional career ==
After going undrafted in the 2013 NBA draft, Releford signed with Okapi Aalstar of the Ethias League on June 28, 2013. In 42 games, he averaged 7.2 points and 1.9 rebounds per game, helping them win the supercup and make it to league final. Releford also played 3 games in the EuroChallenge where he had averages of 5.3 points, 2.7 rebounds and 2.3 assists per game.

A year later, Releford signed with the Mississauga Power of the Canadian league, where he averaged 21.5 points, 6.0 rebounds, 4.1 assists and 1.3 steals in 15 games. On February 11, 2015, he left Mississauga to play for Maccabi Kiryat Gat of Israel.

On October 31, 2015, Releford was selected by the Idaho Stampede in the third round of the 2015 NBA Development League draft. On November 13, he made his debut for Idaho in a 110–106 loss to the Rio Grande Valley Vipers, recording four points, one rebound, two assists, one steal and two blocks in 23 minutes off the bench. On January 6, 2016, he was waived by Idaho after averaging 4.6 points, 1.6 rebounds and 0.9 assists in 16 games. On March 15, he signed with the Niagara River Lions of the NBL Canada.

On October 14, 2016, Releford signed with Polish club Siarka Tarnobrzeg. On February 27, 2017, he moved to Wilki Morskie Szczecin for the rest of the season.

On November 6, 2017, Releford signed with Limburg United of the Belgian League. In 2018, he signed in Cyprus with AEK Larnaca.

== Personal life ==
The son of Venita Vann, Releford is the second-oldest child in a family of four boys and two girls, including his younger brother, point guard Trevor Releford, whom he has previously faced on the court. He graduated from Kansas with a degree in African and African American studies.
