= List of 1989 Seattle Mariners draft picks =

1989 Seattle Mariners draft picks
Information
Owners	George Argyros Jeff Smulyan
General Manager(s)	Woody Woodward
Manager(s)	Jim Lefebvre
First pick	Roger Salkeld
Draft position	3rd
Number of selections	70
Links
Results	Baseball-Reference
Official Site	The Official Site of the Seattle Mariners
Years	1988 • 1989 • 1990

The following is a list of 1989 Seattle Mariners draft picks. The Mariners took part in the June regular draft, also known as the Rule 4 draft. The Mariners made 70 selections in the 1989 draft, the first being right-handed pitcher Roger Salkeld in the first round. In all, the Mariners selected 30 pitchers, 14 outfielders, 11 shortstops, 5 catchers, 5 first basemen, 4 third basemen, and 1 second baseman.

== Draft ==
=== Key ===
Round (Pick)	Indicates the round and pick the player was drafted
Position	Indicates the secondary/collegiate position at which the player was drafted, rather than the professional position the player may have gone on to play
**Bold**	Indicates the player signed with the Mariners
Italics	Indicates the player did not sign with the Mariners
*	Indicates the player made an appearance in Major League Baseball

=== Table ===
Round (Pick)	Name	Position	School	Source
1 (3)	**Roger Salkeld**	Right-handed pitcher	Saugus High School	
1 (26)	Scott Burrell	Right-handed pitcher	Hamden High School	
4 (90)	**Kyle Duke**	Left-handed pitcher	Newman Smith High School	
5 (117)	**Jim Gutierrez**	Right-handed pitcher	Burlington-Edison High School	
6 (143)	**Dave Evans**	Right-handed pitcher	San Jacinto College	
7 (169)	**Scott Lodgek**	Right-handed pitcher	University of North Carolina at Chapel Hill	
8 (195)	**Sean Twitty**	Outfielder	Monsignor McClancy Memorial High School	
9 (221)	**Bill Kostich**	Left-handed pitcher	Taylor Center Baptist Academy	
10 (247)	**Fred McNair**	Shortstop	Bleckley County High School	
11 (273)	Charlie Greene	Catcher	Miami Killian High School	
12 (299)	**Jim Newlin**	Right-handed pitcher	Wichita State University	
13 (325)	**Mark Brakebill**	Third baseman	Glendale Community College	
14 (351)	**Valentine Ballesteros**	Left-handed pitcher	Southwestern Michigan College	
15 (377)	**Lash Batley**	First baseman	Long Beach City College	
16 (403)	**Richard Lodding**	Right-handed pitcher	Cypress College	
17 (429)	**Oscar Rivas**	Left-handed pitcher	Arizona State University	
18 (455)	Keith Tippett	Shortstop	Forest High School	
19 (481)	**Matthew Kluge**	Catcher	Hillsborough High School	
20 (507)	**Pat Russo**	Right-handed pitcher	University of Tampa	
21 (533)	**Damon Saetre**	First baseman	Western Michigan University	
22 (559)	**Mike LeBlanc**	Right-handed pitcher	University of Maine	
23 (585)	Dave Mlicki	Right-handed pitcher	Oklahoma State University–Stillwater	
24 (611)	**Melvin DeJesus**	Right-handed pitcher	Stella Márquez School	
25 (637)	**Richard Hanlin**	Outfielder	California State University, San Bernardino	
26 (663)	**Darin Loe**	Right-handed pitcher	Valley City State University	
27 (689)	**David Smith**	Outfielder	University of Louisiana at Lafayette	
28 (715)	**Philip Black**	Left-handed pitcher	University of North Florida	
29 (741)	**Winston LeBlanc**	Shortstop	Mississippi Delta Community College	
30 (767)	**Tom Duffin**	Third baseman	University of South Alabama	
31 (793)	Jason Ogden	Right-handed pitcher	San Jacinto College	
32 (819)	**Bryan Hartman**	First baseman	Turner High School	
33 (845)	**Darryl Boyd**	Right-handed pitcher	College of the Siskiyous	
34 (871)	**Israel Seda**	Second baseman	Cabo Rojo Christian Academy	
35 (897)	**Gaylon Johnson**	Catcher	Central Valley High School	
36 (923)	**David Hobbs**	Right-handed pitcher	Fort Pierce Westwood High School	
37 (949)	Steve Surico	Left-handed pitcher	Loyola Marymount University	
38 (975)	**Todd Youngblood**	Shortstop	Cochise College	
39 (1001)	**Keith Bryant**	Right-handed pitcher	Mount Vernon Nazarene University	
40 (1027)	**James Schultz**	Catcher	Robbinsdale Cooper High School	
41 (1053)	Cedric Allen	Left-handed pitcher	Johnston High School	
42 (1079)	Joseph Madden	Shortstop	Salesian High School	
43 (1104)	Larry Mitchell	Right-handed pitcher	Charlottesville High School	
44 (1129)	Andru Small	Third baseman	San Bernardino Valley College	
45 (1152)	**L. V. Powell**	Outfielder	Cerritos College	
46 (1175)	**Jesus Gonzalez**	Catcher	Triton College	
47 (1197)	**Tommy Boudreau**	Outfielder	Cerritos College	
48 (1219)	**Alvin Rittman**	Shortstop	Bethune-Cookman University	
49 (1240)	**Landon Williams**	Shortstop	Grambling State University	
50 (1260)	**Bobby Magallanes**	Shortstop	Cerritos College	
51 (1280)	**Brian Turang**	Outfielder	Loyola Marymount University	
52 (1299)	**Mark Czarkowski**	Left-handed pitcher	University of Hartford	
53 (1317)	**Brian Morrow**	Outfielder	Wichita State University	
54 (1335)	**John Johnson**	Shortstop	Channel Islands High School	
55 (1352)	Brian McGlone	Shortstop	Hillsborough Community College	
56 (1367)	Andre Keene	First baseman	DuVal High School	
57 (1380)	Thomas Wilson	Outfielder	California State University, Fullerton	
58 (1392)	**James Terrell**	Outfielder	Dr. James J. Hogan High School	
59 (1404)	Ryan Lefebvre	Outfielder	Loyola High School	
60 (1416)	**James Beauchamp**	Right-handed pitcher	Modesto Junior College	
61 (1425)	**David Utz**	Right-handed pitcher	Ocean Springs High School	
62 (1432)	D. J. Boston	First baseman	Woodward High School	
63 (1437)	**Marcus Urban**	Right-handed pitcher	Hug High School	
64 (1441)	**Matthew Winton**	Outfielder	Merced College	
65 (1445)	**Clem Barlow**	Outfielder	Southern Union State Community College	
66 (1449)	Walter Rivera	Right-handed pitcher	Chipola College	
67 (1453)	**Dusty Madsen**	Outfielder	Sacramento City College	
68 (1457)	**Paul Perkins**	Right-handed pitcher	Solano Community College	
69 (1461)	Wardell Marine	Third baseman	El Camino Real High School	
70 (1465)	**Dexter St. George**	Outfielder	Southern Union State Community College	
71 (1468)	**Sidney Stigall**	Shortstop	Eau Gallie High School	
