= Dan Dercher =

American football player (born 1976)

No. 79
- Position: Offensive tackle

Personal information
- Born: June 2, 1976 (age 50); Kansas City, Kansas, U.S.
- Listed height: 6 ft 5 in (1.96 m)
- Listed weight: 293 lb (133 kg)

Career information
- High school: Bishop Miege (Roeland Park, Kansas)
- College: Kansas
- NFL draft: 1999: undrafted

Career history
- San Francisco 49ers (1999–2000)
- Stats at Pro Football Reference

Daniel Lawrence Dercher (born June 2, 1976) is an American former professional football player who was an offensive tackle for the San Francisco 49ers of the National Football League (NFL). He played college football for the Kansas Jayhawks.
