= Bishop Miege Catholic High School =

Location
- 5041 Reinhardt Drive; Roeland Park, Kansas 66205; United States; 39°2′8″N 94°37′29″W

Information
- Type: Private high school
- Motto: Excellence: Our Goal; Success: Our Tradition
- Religious affiliation: Roman Catholic
- Patron saint: Bishop John Baptist Miège
- Established: 1958; 68 years ago
- President: Michael Riley
- Principal: Maureen Engen
- Chaplain: Father Andrew Strobl
- Teaching staff: 41.4 (FTE) (2017–18)
- Grades: 9–12
- Gender: Coeducational
- Enrollment: 689 (2017–18)
- Student to teacher ratio: 16.6 (2017–18)
- Colors: Royal blue Scarlet red
- Athletics conference: Eastern Kansas League
- Mascot: Stag
- Nickname: Big Red, The Mighty Stags, Big Red Crew, Little Red
- Accreditation: North Central Association of Colleges and Schools
- Publication: Facets (literary magazine)
- Newspaper: The Miegian
- Yearbook: The Hart
- Affiliation: Kansas City (KS) Archdiocese; KSHSAA
- Website: www.bishopmiege.com

Bishop Miege Catholic High School is a private, coeducational college-preparatory high school in Roeland Park, Kansas, United States. For two years in a row, Bishop Miege has been named the #1 Catholic High School in Kansas. The school is a member of the Kansas State High School Activities Association.

The school competes in athletics and offers extracurricular programs in speech and debate, robotics, journalism, performing arts, visual arts, and other student activities. Its athletic teams have won numerous Kansas state championships.

== Campus ==
Bishop Miege Catholic High School is located directly north of the Shawnee Indian Mission. The campus includes facilities for academics, athletics, fine arts, and student activities.

The Our Lady of Lourdes Grotto is a Marian devotional site on the school campus. completed in 2026. It reflects the school's Catholic identity and devotion to the Virgin Mary.

The Joseph Michael Pedrotti Innovation Center, opened in 2024, expanded the school's facilities for engineering and project-based learning. The center includes an Engineering Lab and Project Studio, as well as an academic makerspace used by students for design, collaboration, and hands-on projects.

The campus also includes facilities for visual and performing arts, including spaces for theatre, music, art, video production, debate and forensics, and journalism. The Lisa Loepz-Galvan Production Studio is a student media and production facility dedicated in 2026. The studio provides students with opportunities for audio and video production.

== History ==
Bishop Miege Catholic High School was established in 1958 by the Roman Catholic Archdiocese of Kansas City in Kansas and was named after Bishop John Baptiste Miege, the first bishop of the Kansas Territory, which eventually became the current Archdiocese of Kansas City in Kansas. It is the successor to St. Agnes High School, established in 1949, named for the parish that it was founded by, and the mascot (Stag) retains this heritage (St. Agnes). Bishop Miege was instituted as a co-educational archdiocese school intended to serve northeastern Johnson County.

== Academics ==
Bishop Miege offers a college-preparatory curriculum that includes honors classes, Advanced Placement courses, dual-enrollment opportunities through Johnson County Community College and Benedictine College with 30 college credit opportunities available.

Academic support facilities include the Math Hub, which provides individual and small-group assistance, and the Writing Lab, a dedicated space for students to develop writing skills across subject areas.

=== Project Lead the Way Distinguished Program ===
Through Project Lead the Way, Bishop Miege offers pathways in engineering, biomedical science, and computer science. The school has been named a PLTW Distinguished Program.

=== KSHSAA Performing Arts School of Excellence ===
Bishop Miege was recognized as a Performing Arts School of Excellence by the Kansas State High School Activities Association (KSHSAA), recognizing the school's programs in music, theatre, and other performing arts.

== Extracurricular activities ==
=== Robotics ===
The Bishop Miege Robotics team is FIRST Robotics Competition Team 1997. The team was founded for the 2006 FRC season, in which it won the Regional competition and advanced to FIRST Championship.

=== Athletics ===
Dixon Doll Stadium was completed for the Homecoming soccer and football games in 2007. A cellular tower was placed on the site near the stadium, with Sprint and Verizon Wireless committing to utilize the tower. Bishop Miege has won 125 athletic state championships.

==== Basketball ====
The girls' basketball team won the state championship 24 times, occurring in 1978, 1980, 1984, 1985, 1989, 1990, 1991, 1992, 1994, 1995, 1996, 2001, 2002, 2003, 2007, 2009, 2014, 2015, 2016, 2017, 2019, 2021, 2022, 2023 and 2024. Coach Terry English coached the girls at Miege for over 40 years. He had a career winning percentage of .844 and a won-loss record through 2020-21 of 910–166. The boys' basketball team is led by Rick Zych, who has won the state championship in 2001, 2010, 2016, 2017, 2018, 2021 and 2022.

==== Bowling ====
Bowling has only been recognized as a varsity sport since 2005 according to the KSHSAA. They won the state championship in 2007.

==== Cross Country ====
The girls' cross country team won the state championship in 1978, 1982, 1983, 1986, 1988, 1989, 1990, 1991, 1992, 1993, 1994, and 2004. The boys' cross country team won the state championship in 1982, 1983, 1985, 1989, 1991, 1992, 1995, and 1997. The Miege cross country teams are coached by Joann Heap.

==== Football ====
Bishop Miege has won the state championship in football 11 times, occurring in 1972, 1975, 1977, 2009, 2014, 2015, 2016, 2017, 2018, 2019, and 2022

Miege is one of only two schools to win six consecutive state championships since the KSHSAA first sponsored playoffs to determine football state champions in 1969. The other is Hutchinson from 2004 through 2009.

In 2006, Miege went 3–7 and the following year went 7–3 (and had a playoff appearance beating Shawnee Heights, but lost to Blue Valley West in the second round. In 2008, the Stags went 6–4 and lost in the first round of the playoffs to Baldwin. In 2009 Miege went 12–2, finishing with a 10-game winning streak. The Stags played their way through the playoffs and won their first state title in 33 years, beating Topeka Hayden by a score of 28–6.

==== Soccer ====
The Boys' soccer team has won the state championship 12 times (1998, 2000, 2012, 2013, 2016, 2017, 2018, 2019, 2020, 2021, 2022 and 2023). The 8 straight state championships is the longest streak for a boys athletics program in school history and is tied for the KSHSAA state record. They also have three top 30 in the country finishes and seven Top 15 in the Midwest finishes. The Miege girls' soccer team has won the state championship 10 times (2003, 2016, 2017, 2018, 2019, 2021, 2022, 2023, 2024, 2025). Their 9 straight state titles are the KSHSAA state record. They have also won a National Academic Award for 14 straight years. The soccer programs are both led by 2001 alum, Nate Huppe.

==== Volleyball ====
Miege volleyball is currently coached by Lindsay Zych Franco. During her coaching career, coach Gwen Pike led the program to over 1,000 career wins, and she was inducted into the National High School Athletic Coaches Association Hall of Fame in 2006. The Miege volleyball team has won 30 state championships.

==== Wrestling ====
The single-season record for the best overall record by any wrestler was 34–0 set in 1986–87.

=== State championships ===
State Championships
Season	Sport	Number of Championships	Year
Fall	Cross Country, Boys'	8	1982, 1983, 1985, 1989, 1991, 1992, 1995, 1997
Fall	Cross Country, Girls'	12	1978, 1982, 1983, 1986, 1988, 1989, 1990, 1991, 1992, 1993, 1994, 2004
Fall	Football	11	1972, 1975, 1977, 2009, 2014, 2015, 2016, 2017, 2018, 2019, 2022
Fall	Soccer, Boys'	12	1998, 2000, 2012, 2013, 2016, 2017, 2018, 2019, 2020, 2021, 2022, 2023
Fall	Volleyball	30	1977, 1978, 1979, 1980, 1981, 1982, 1983, 1985, 1986, 1989, 1991, 1992, 1993, 1994, 2002, 2003, 2004, 2008, 2009, 2010, 2011, 2013, 2014, 2015, 2018, 2020, 2022, 2023, 2024, 2026
Winter	Basketball, Boys'	7	2001, 2010, 2016, 2017, 2018, 2021, 2022
Winter	Basketball, Girls'	25	1978, 1980, 1984, 1985, 1989, 1990, 1991, 1992, 1994, 1995, 1996, 2001, 2002, 2003, 2007, 2009, 2014, 2015, 2016, 2017, 2019, 2021, 2022, 2023, 2024
Winter	Bowling, boys'	1	2007
Winter	Swimming and Diving, Boys'	1	2014
Spring	Baseball	2	1996, 2021
Spring	Golf, Boys'	2	2001, 2022
Spring	Soccer, Girls'	10	2003, 2016, 2017, 2018, 2019, 2021, 2022, 2023, 2024, 2025
Spring	Softball	1	2002
Spring	Swimming and Diving, Girls'	1	2017
Spring	Tennis, Boys'	2	1986, 1991
Spring	Tennis, Girls'	2	1991, 1992
Spring	Track and Field, Boys'	1	2016
Spring	Track and Field, Girls'	2	1990, 2005
Activities	Debate	11	4-speaker: 1998, 1999, 2000, 2004, 2006, 2010, 2017, 2019, 2021, 2025 2-speaker: 2017
Activities	Forensics	1	1989
Activities	Journalism	2	2023, 2024
Total		143	

== Notable alumni ==
- Bol Bol, professional basketball player for the Phoenix Suns
- Dan Connolly, computer scientist
- Montell Cozart, Canadian football quarterback for Calgary Stampeders; former player for the Boise State Broncos.
- Dan Dercher, former NFL offensive tackle
- Joyce DiDonato, opera singer
- Dave Doeren, head football coach, North Carolina State University
- Gillian Flynn, author, screenwriter and comic book writer
- Catherine Fox, Olympic gold medalist swimmer
- Chris Howard, former MLB catcher, Seattle Mariners
- Jamar Howard, former professional basketball player
- Daniel Jackson, wide receiver for the Minnesota Golden Gophers
- Spencer Jones, professional basketball player for the Denver Nuggets
- Jason Kander, 39th Missouri Secretary of State and Democratic nominee for 2016 U.S. Senate election in Missouri
- Dave Martin, former NFL linebacker
- Graham Mertz, college football quarterback
- Mark Mitchell, college basketball player
- Matt Pryor, founding member and the lead vocalist of The Get Up Kids
- Shane Ray, American football outside linebacker for the Toronto Argonauts of the Canadian Football League
- Willie Reed, former NBA center for Los Angeles Clippers
- Travis Releford, professional basketball player and former player for the Kansas Jayhawks
- Trevor Releford, professional basketball player and former player for the Alabama Crimson Tide
- Jeremiah Robinson-Earl, professional basketball player for the New Orleans Pelicans
- Mike Ruether, former NFL offensive lineman
- Max Shortell, former college football quarterback
- Payton Verhulst, college basketball player
- Ryan Willis, professional football player for the Chicago Bears
