= Steve Ontiveros (pitcher) =

American baseball player (born 1961)

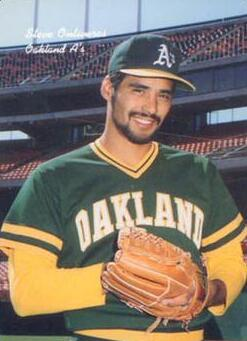
- Ontiveros with the Oakland Athletics c. 1986
- Pitcher
- Born: March 5, 1961 (age 65); Tularosa, New Mexico, U.S.
- Batted: Right Threw: Right

MLB debut
- June 14, 1985, for the Oakland Athletics

Last MLB appearance
- October 1, 2000, for the Boston Red Sox

MLB statistics
- Win–loss record: 34–31
- Earned run average: 3.67
- Strikeouts: 382
- Stats at Baseball Reference

Teams
- Oakland Athletics (1985–1988); Philadelphia Phillies (1989–1990); Seattle Mariners (1993); Oakland Athletics (1994–1995); Boston Red Sox (2000)

Career highlights and awards
- All-Star (1995); AL ERA leader (1994)

Steven Ontiveros (born March 5, 1961) is an American former pitcher in Major League Baseball (MLB). He played for the Oakland Athletics (1985–1988, 1994–1995), Philadelphia Phillies (1989–1990), Seattle Mariners (1993) and Boston Red Sox (2000). He led the American League (AL) in earned run average (ERA) in 1994 and was the losing pitcher in the 1995 MLB All-Star Game. He threw and batted right-handed.

== Playing career ==
Ontiveros played two years of high school baseball at Brandywine High School in Niles, Michigan, then two years at St. Joseph’s High School in South Bend, Indiana. He then played college baseball for the Michigan Wolverines. He set program records by pitching in 21 games in a season and 56 games pitched in his career.

The Oakland Athletics drafted Ontiveros in the second round of the 1982 MLB draft. He was named the pitcher of the year of the Albany A's in 1983. The next season, he dealt with an arm injury then, during a rafting trip, cut a finger on his throwing hand. Ontiveros made his MLB debut in June 1985 as a relief pitcher, getting eight saves and posting a 1.93 ERA in his rookie season. He had a career-high 10 saves in 1986, filling in for Jay Howell as Oakland's closer before missing most of the second half of the season with an elbow injury. New Athletics manager Tony La Russa moved Ontiveros to the starting rotation in 1987, where he had career-highs with 10 wins and 150 2/3 innings pitched. He started 10 games in 1988, but arm ligament damage forced him to undergo surgery, and he did not pitch in the postseason for the division champions.

Ontiveros signed with the Philadelphia Phillies in February 1989. In April, he got his only MLB hit, a three-RBI double. He missed most of the season with another elbow surgery. He pitched in five games for the Phillies in relief in 1990.

Ontiveros did not return to the majors until August 1993. He pitched for the Phillies' Triple-A team in 1991, then missed 1992 with another arm injury. He pitched in Triple-A for the Minnesota Twins in 1993 before being traded to the Seattle Mariners for minor league outfielder Greg Shockey. Ontiveros replaced Brad Holman, who was struck in the head by a line drive, on Seattle's roster. His 1.00 ERA in 18 innings for the Mariners was his lowest in an MLB season.

Ontiveros re-signed with the Athletics in 1994. Working as a swingman, he led the AL with a 2.65 ERA in the strike-shortened season. After the season, he signed a $1 million contract the largest of his career, to return to the Athletics. In 1995, Ontiveros earned a trip to the All-Star Game, where he gave up Jeff Conine's game-winning home run and took the loss.

Ontiveros signed with the California Angels in 1996 but was prevented from pitching due to injuries. He returned to the Angels in 1997, playing in a total of three High-A games in two seasons with the club. Over the next three seasons, he played for four different Triple-A teams as well as the independent Valley Vipers. After four seasons out of the majors, he signed with the Boston Red Sox in September 2000 and pitched in his final three MLB games, including two starts. He pitched for two Triple-A teams in 2001.

In a ten-season MLB career, Ontiveros posted a 34–31 record with 19 saves and a 3.67 ERA in 207 games pitched (73 as a starter).

== Personal life ==
Ontiveros is married.

At the University of Michigan, Ontiveros earned a bachelor's degree in physical education.

Ontiveros was the pitching coach for the China national team in the 2008 Summer Olympics. He was ejected from a game against the United States.

Ontiveros owns and operates Player's Choice Academy in Scottsdale, Arizona.

== See also ==
- List of Major League Baseball annual ERA leaders
