= Hal Keller =

American baseball player (1927-2012)

- Catcher
- Born: July 7, 1927; Middletown, Maryland, U.S.
- Died: June 5, 2012 (aged 84); Sequim, Washington, U.S.
- Batted: Left Threw: Right

MLB debut
- September 13, 1949, for the Washington Senators

Last MLB appearance
- July 28, 1952, for the Washington Senators

MLB statistics
- Batting average: .204
- Home runs: 1
- Runs batted in: 5
- Stats at Baseball Reference

Teams
- Washington Senators (1949–1950, 1952)

Harold Kefauver Keller (July 7, 1927 – June 5, 2012) was an American professional baseball player and executive who served as the fourth general manager in the history of the Seattle Mariners of Major League Baseball (1984–85). Born on a farm in Middletown, Maryland, he graduated from the University of Maryland with a degree in economics and served in the United States Army during World War II. Keller's older brother, Charlie, was an All-Star left fielder with the New York Yankees.

== Baseball career ==
During an eight-season pro playing career, which began in 1948, Keller appeared as a catcher in 25 MLB games for the Washington Senators between 1949 and 1952. A left-handed batter, he stood 6 feet 1 inch (1.85 m) tall and weighed 200 pounds (91 kg). His 11 big-league hits included five doubles and one home run, a two-run shot hit at Fenway Park off James Atkins of the Boston Red Sox on September 29, 1950.

After managing in the Senators' farm system during the late 1950s, he scouted for them until the franchise moved to Minneapolis–Saint Paul as the Minnesota Twins after the 1960 season. Keller, however, remained in Washington as farm system director of the expansion Senators in 1961 and 1962. After spending 1963 with his old organization, the Twins, as a scout, Keller rejoined the expansion Senators as their director of player development and scouting in 1964, a post he held for 15 years, through the team's 1972 transfer to Dallas–Fort Worth as the Texas Rangers.

After 1978, Keller left the Rangers to become farm system and scouting director of the Seattle Mariners (1979–83). During his two decades as farm and scouting director with the Senators/Rangers and the Mariners, he signed and developed players such as Phil Bradley, Jeff Burroughs, Joe Coleman, Mike Hargrove, Mark Langston, Bill Madlock, Jim Sundberg and Bill Swift.

Keller then served as the Mariners' vice president, baseball operations, and general manager from October 1983 to July 12, 1985, when he resigned. The Mariners went 115–132 (.466) during his 11/2-year term as general manager, while incorporating Langston, Swift, Alvin Davis and Jim Presley into their lineup. He later scouted for the Detroit Tigers and Anaheim Angels.

Hal Keller died in his sleep at home in Sequim, Washington, aged 84. He had been battling diabetes and esophageal cancer.

Preceded by Dan O'Brien Sr.	Seattle Mariners General Manager; 1984–1985	Succeeded by Dick Balderson
