= 1995 Major League Baseball All-Star Game =

1995 American baseball competition

	1	2	3	4	5	6	7	8	9	R	H	E
National League	0	0	0	0	0	1	1	1	0	3	3	0
American League	0	0	0	2	0	0	0	0	0	2	8	0
- Date: July 11, 1995
- Venue: The Ballpark in Arlington
- City: Arlington, Texas
- Managers: Felipe Alou (MON); Buck Showalter (NYY)
- MVP: Jeff Conine (FLA)
- Attendance: 50,920
- Ceremonial first pitch: Nolan Ryan
- Television: ABC
- TV announcers: Al Michaels, Tim McCarver and Jim Palmer
- Radio: CBS
- Radio announcers: John Rooney, Jerry Coleman and Jeff Torborg

The 1995 Major League Baseball All-Star Game was the 66th playing of the midsummer classic between the all-stars of the American League (AL) and National League (NL), the two leagues comprising Major League Baseball. The game was held on July 11, 1995, at The Ballpark in Arlington in Arlington, Texas, the home of the Texas Rangers of the American League. It was the third All-Star Game held in the state of Texas (with the previous two hosted by Houston) and the first All-Star Game held in the area of Dallas–Fort Worth metroplex. (Note: It was also the third time the franchise hosted an All-Star Game. In 1962 and 1969, the franchise, then known as the Washington Senators, served as host with their venue in Robert F. Kennedy Memorial Stadium.) In this All-Star Game, American League pitchers held National League batters to just three base hits, but all three were home runs as the National League defeated the American League 3–2. This is also the most recent All-Star Game to be televised by the ABC television network.

Because of the 1994–95 Major League Baseball strike and the lack of official champions, the leagues chose to designate the managers of the unofficial league champions (teams with the best record at the time of abandonment of the season) as managers for this All-Star Game. The All-Star break that season was actually only two days - because of the strike induced schedule in 1995, there were games scheduled for the next day. As a result, by the time this game ended, several players had already flown out of Texas to get to where their teams were playing the next day.

There were two color guards participating in the pregame ceremonies. The Royal Canadian Mounted Police National Color Guard from Ottawa, Ontario, carried the Canadian flag, while the 1995-96 Del Rio (TX) High School ROTC Color Guard carried the American flag. Country singer Michelle Wright later sang "O Canada", while fellow country singer (and native Texan) Lyle Lovett sang "The Star-Spangled Banner". Nolan Ryan threw out the ceremonial first pitch.

National League President Len Coleman presented Jeff Conine with the All-Star Game MVP Award in lieu of the Commissioner of Baseball, marking the second year in a row that Coleman presided over the MVP Award presentation.

== Rosters ==
Players in italics have since been inducted into the National Baseball Hall of Fame.

=== National League ===
Elected starters
Position	Player	Team	All-Star Games
C	Mike Piazza	Dodgers	3
1B	Fred McGriff	Braves	3
2B	Craig Biggio	Astros	4
3B	Matt Williams	Giants	3
SS	Ozzie Smith	Cardinals	14
OF	Barry Bonds	Giants	5
OF	Lenny Dykstra	Phillies	3
OF	Tony Gwynn	Padres	11

Pitchers
Position	Player	Team	All-Star Games
P	Tyler Green	Phillies	1
P	Randy Myers	Cubs	3
P	Denny Neagle	Pirates	1
P	Hideo Nomo	Dodgers	1
P	Carlos Pérez	Expos	1
P	Greg Maddux	Braves	4
P	Heathcliff Slocumb	Phillies	1
P	John Smiley	Reds	2
P	Tom Henke	Cardinals	2
P	Todd Worrell	Dodgers	2

Reserves
Position	Player	Team	All-Star Games
C	Darren Daulton	Phillies	3
1B	Mark Grace	Cubs	2
2B	Mickey Morandini	Phillies	1
3B	Bobby Bonilla	Mets	6
3B	Vinny Castilla	Rockies	1
SS	Barry Larkin	Reds	7
SS	José Offerman	Dodgers	1
OF	Jeff Conine	Marlins	2
OF	Ron Gant	Reds	2
OF	Raúl Mondesí	Dodgers	1
OF	Sammy Sosa	Cubs	1
OF	Reggie Sanders	Reds	1
OF	Dante Bichette	Rockies	2

=== American League ===
Elected starters
Position	Player	Team	All-Star Games
C	Iván Rodríguez	Rangers	4
1B	Frank Thomas	White Sox	3
2B	Carlos Baerga	Indians	3
3B	Wade Boggs	Yankees	11
SS	Cal Ripken Jr.	Orioles	13
OF	Albert Belle	Indians	3
OF	Ken Griffey Jr.	Mariners	6
OF	Kirby Puckett	Twins	10
DH	Edgar Martínez	Mariners	2

Pitchers
Position	Player	Team	All-Star Games
P	Erik Hanson	Red Sox	1
P	Dennis Martínez	Indians	4
P	José Mesa	Indians	1
P	Chuck Finley	Angels	3
P	Randy Johnson	Mariners	4
P	Steve Ontiveros	Athletics	1
P	Kenny Rogers	Rangers	1
P	Kevin Appier	Royals	1
P	Lee Smith	Angels	7
P	David Wells	Tigers	1

Reserves
Position	Player	Team	All-Star Games
C	Mike Stanley	Yankees	1
1B	Tino Martinez	Mariners	1
1B	Mark McGwire	Athletics	7
1B	Mo Vaughn	Red Sox	1
2B	Roberto Alomar	Blue Jays	6
3B	Kevin Seitzer	Brewers	2
SS	Gary DiSarcina	Angels	1
OF	Jim Edmonds	Angels	1
OF	Kenny Lofton	Indians	2
OF	Paul O'Neill	Yankees	3
OF	Manny Ramirez	Indians	1

== Game ==
=== Umpires ===
Home Plate	Durwood Merrill (AL)
First Base	Charlie Williams (NL)
Second Base	Al Clark (AL) (crew chief)
Third Base	Mike Winters (NL)
Left Field	Ted Hendry (AL)
Right Field	Ed Rapuano (NL)

=== Starting lineups ===
National League				American League			
Order	Player	Team	Position	Order	Player	Team	Position
1	Lenny Dykstra	Phillies	CF	1	Kenny Lofton	Indians	CF
2	Tony Gwynn	Padres	RF	2	Carlos Baerga	Indians	2B
3	Barry Bonds	Giants	LF	3	Edgar Martínez	Mariners	DH
4	Mike Piazza	Dodgers	C	4	Frank Thomas	White Sox	1B
5	Fred McGriff	Braves	1B	5	Albert Belle	Indians	LF
6	Ron Gant	Reds	DH	6	Cal Ripken Jr.	Orioles	SS
7	Barry Larkin	Reds	SS	7	Wade Boggs	Yankees	3B
8	Vinny Castilla	Rockies	3B	8	Kirby Puckett	Twins	RF
9	Craig Biggio	Astros	2B	9	Iván Rodríguez	Rangers	C
	Hideo Nomo	Dodgers	P		Randy Johnson	Mariners	P

=== Game summary ===
Tuesday, July 11, 1995 7:29 pm (CT) at The Ballpark in Arlington in Arlington, Texas
Team	1	2	3	4	5	6	7	8	9	R	H	E
National League	0	0	0	0	0	1	1	1	0	3	3	0
American League	0	0	0	2	0	0	0	0	0	2	8	0
WP: Heathcliff Slocumb (1-0) LP: Steve Ontiveros (0-1); Home runs: NL: Craig Biggio (1), Mike Piazza (1), Jeff Conine (1); AL: Frank Thomas (1)

== Broadcasting ==
The 1995 All-Star Game was the first Major League Baseball All-Star Game to be televised by ABC since the 1988 edition from Cincinnati. Just like in 1988, Al Michaels provided play-by-play duties for ABC alongside color commentators Jim Palmer and Tim McCarver. Also assisting in ABC's coverage were John Saunders (who interviewed players in the American League dugout), Lesley Visser (who interviewed players in the National League dugout as well as game MVP Jeff Conine), and Rick Dempsey (who interviewed players inside the bullpen at the Ballpark in Arlington).

The 1995 All-Star Game officially launched the second season for The Baseball Network, which was a consortium that ABC was in partnership with Major League Baseball as well as NBC. As previously alluded to, the inaugural season in 1994 was cut short due to a players' strike that began on August 12 and wound up causing the World Series (for which ABC was due to broadcast) to be cancelled. The strike proved to hurt the long term viability of The Baseball Network. The arraignment between Major League Baseball, ABC, and NBC was originally supposed to run at least through the 1999 season. But instead, both networks announced on June 22, 1995, that they would be dissolving The Baseball Network after that year's World Series.
