= Brad Holman =

American baseball player and coach (born 1968)

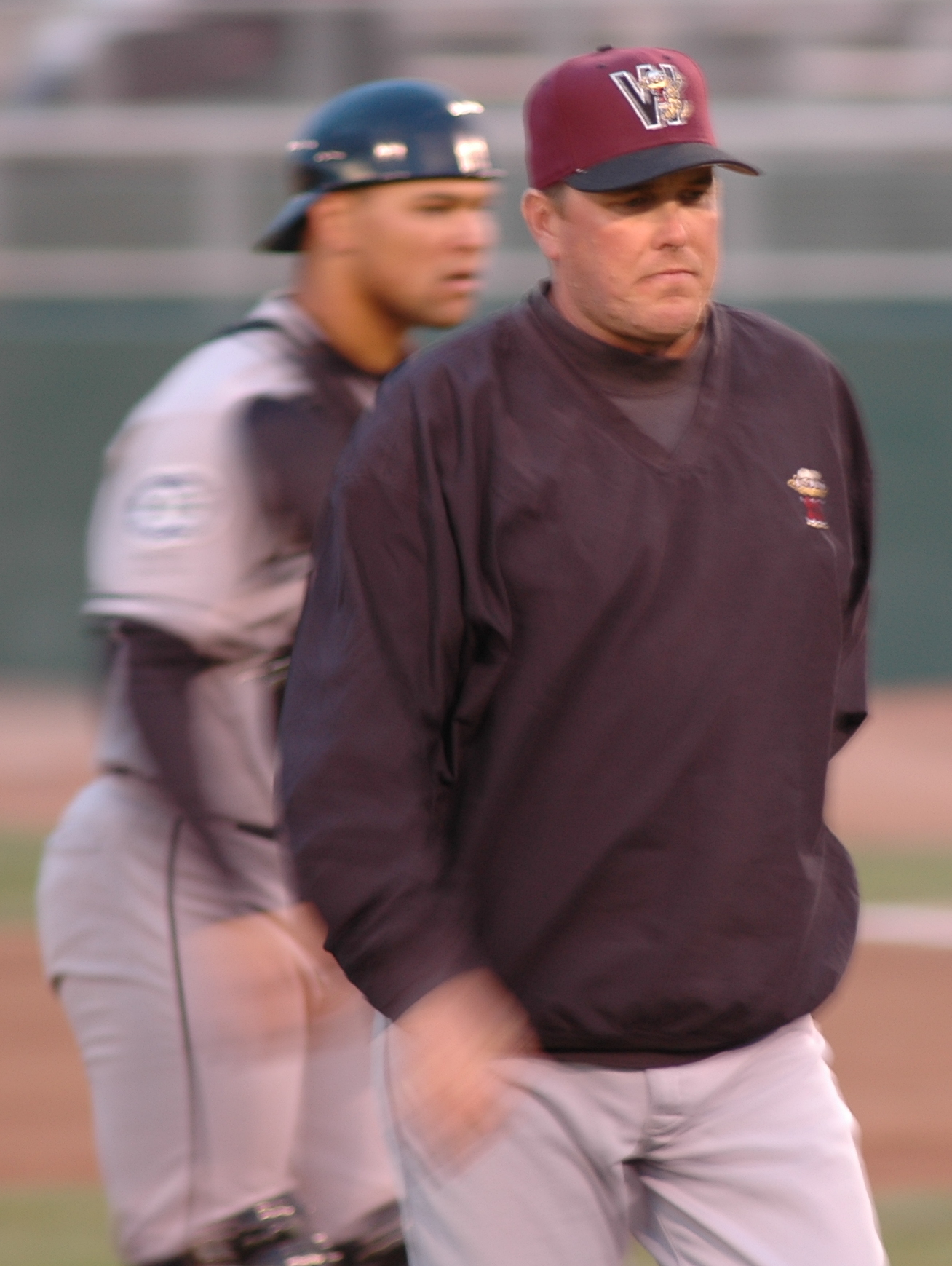
- Holman (right) with the Wisconsin Timber Rattlers in 2005
- Pitcher
- Born: February 9, 1968 (age 58); Kansas City, Missouri, U.S.
- Batted: Right Threw: Right

MLB debut
- July 4, 1993, for the Seattle Mariners

Last MLB appearance
- October 2, 1993, for the Seattle Mariners

MLB statistics
- Win–loss record: 1–3
- Earned run average: 3.72
- Strikeouts: 17
- Stats at Baseball Reference

Teams
- As player: Seattle Mariners (1993); As coach: Texas Rangers (2015–2017)

Bradley Thomas Holman (born February 9, 1968) is an American former professional baseball pitcher and coach. He pitched in 19 games for the 1993 Seattle Mariners in Major League Baseball, playing in the minor leagues for six additional seasons. He then became a coach, serving as the bullpen coach for the Texas Rangers in 2015 and 2016.

== Playing career ==
Holman attended Wichita North High School in Wichita, Kansas, then played college baseball for the Auburn Montgomery Senators. He was an National Association of Intercollegiate Athletics honorable mention All-American in 1990.

The Kansas City Royals drafted Holman in the 35th round of the 1990 Major League Baseball draft. He played 17 games for Low-A Eugene in 1990 but was released on March 29, 1991. On April 7, he signed with the Seattle Mariners and was assigned to High-A Peninsula. In 47 games, he had a 6–6 record and a 3.22 ERA. After beginning 1992 with Peninsula, he was promoted to Double-A Jacksonville. After the season, he pitched for the Chandler Diamondbacks in the Arizona Fall League. In 1993, he made his major league debut after starting the season with the Triple-A Calgary Cannons.

Holman finished the first five MLB games of his career, earning saves on July 22 and 24 in Cleveland. While pitching on August 8, he suffered bruised sinus cavity after being hit in the head by a line drive from Mario Díaz. The ball caromed into the dugout, giving Díaz a ground rule double. He returned to the mound 20 days later. In his only MLB season, he was 1–3 with 3 saves and a 3.72 ERA.

Holman returned to Triple-A Calgary in 1994. He began the 1995 with Seattle's Triple-A team, now the Tacoma Rainiers, pitched once for the Rochester Red Wings in the Baltimore Orioles system, and 7 games for the Colorado Rockies's Double-A team, the New Haven Ravens. He pitched three games for the independent Amarillo Dillas in 1996.

== Coaching career ==
After retiring as a player, Holman worked as a mechanic at a Boeing plant in Wichita. He was laid off in 2001.

Holman began his coaching career in the Mariners' organization as the pitching coach for Low-A Wisconsin in 2002, holding that role through 2004. In 2006, he was the pitching coach for Double-A San Antonio, then for Double-A West Tenn in 2007. In 2008, he served as the pitching coach for the Double-A Altoona Curve in the Pittsburgh Pirates organization. During the 2008 offseason Holman signed a contract with the Texas Rangers organization to coach for the Single-A Hickory Crawdads where he coached through 2010. In 2011, he became pitching coach for the Single-A Myrtle Beach Pelicans where he coached through 2012. Then he was promoted to pitching coach in Triple-A with the Round Rock Express where he coached from 2013 through 2015.

On November 5, 2015, Holman became the bullpen coach for the Texas Rangers. He was fired after the 2017 season.

Holman was named as the pitching coach for the Syracuse Chiefs, the Triple-A affiliate of the Washington Nationals, for the 2018 season. He held the same job in 2019 as Washington changed Triple-A affiliates, working for the Fresno Grizzlies. In 2020 and 2021, he was Washington's minor league pitching coordinator.

Holman and his wife have run a baseball training facility in Wichita since 2003.

== Personal life ==
Holman's older brother Brian is also a former MLB pitcher, playing for Montreal Expos and Seattle Mariners. They were teammates in 1993, though Brian was injured the entire season. Their stepfather Dick LeMay also pitched in MLB.

Holman is married and has two children.

Holman went to high school with football Hall of Famer Barry Sanders.
