= Zak Shinall =

American baseball player (born 1968)

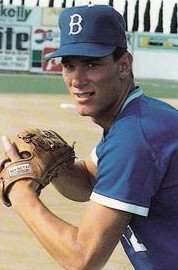
- Shinall in 1988
- Pitcher
- Born: October 14, 1968 (age 57); St. Louis, Missouri
- Batted: Right Threw: Right

MLB debut
- May 12, 1993, for the Seattle Mariners

Last MLB appearance
- May 12, 1993, for the Seattle Mariners

MLB statistics
- Win–loss record: 0–0
- Earned run average: 3.38
- Strikeouts: 0
- Stats at Baseball Reference

Teams
- Seattle Mariners (1993)

Zakary Sebastien Shinall (born October 14, 1968) is an American former professional baseball relief pitcher. He pitched in one Major League Baseball (MLB) game for the Seattle Mariners on May 12, 1993. Listed at 6 ft 3 in (1.91 m), 215 pounds (98 kg), Shinall batted and threw right-handed.

== Career ==
Shinall played American Legion baseball, participating in its youth world series in 1986. He played baseball at El Segundo High School in El Segundo, California. He was selected by the Los Angeles Dodgers in the 29th round of the 1987 MLB draft out of El Camino College in Torrance, California. He converted from a starting pitcher to a reliever in mid-1991. He gave up purportedly the longest home run at Cashman Field in Las Vegas, in 1992.

Shinall was traded by the Dodgers to the Cleveland Indians that December, then selected off waivers by Seattle in April 1993. Shinall pitched 2 2/3 innings of relief in his lone MLB game on May 12, 1993 against the Chicago White Sox, allowing one earned run on four hits and two walks and no strikeouts. He did not have a decision and never appeared in a major league game again.

Shinall also pitched eight seasons in the minor leagues spanning 1987–1995, posting a 38–30 record with a 3.86 ERA and 331 strikeouts in 265 pitching appearances, including 49 starts and one shutout in 560 innings pitched. He played winter ball for the Leones del Caracas of the Venezuelan League during the 1991–1992 season.

== Personal life ==
During his playing career, Shinall enjoyed surfing.
