= Erik Plantenberg =

American baseball player (born 1968)

- Pitcher
- Born: October 30, 1968 (age 57); Renton, Washington, U.S.
- Batted: Both Threw: Left

MLB debut
- July 31, 1993, for the Seattle Mariners

Last MLB appearance
- June 20, 1997, for the Philadelphia Phillies

MLB statistics
- Win–loss record: 0–0
- Earned run average: 4.46
- Strikeouts: 16
- Stats at Baseball Reference

Teams
- Seattle Mariners (1993–1994); Philadelphia Phillies (1997)

Erik John Plantenberg (born October 30, 1968) is an American former Major League Baseball relief pitcher. He attended college at San Diego State University.

The Boston Red Sox drafted Plantenberg in the 16th round of the 1990 MLB draft. He was a Carolina League All-Star in 1991, while with the Lynchburg Red Sox. Elbow injuries ended his 1992 season in late July. The Mariners selected him that December in the Rule 5 draft. He made his MLB debut in July 1993. He held John Olerud hitless in three at bats. "I faced him probably 50 times since I was 13," Plantenberg said of Olerud, who also grew up near Seattle. Plantenberg had a 6.52 ERA in his first major league season, pitching 9 2/3 innings in 20 games. He allowed no runs in six games for the Mariners in 1994. Plantenberg last pitched in MLB in 1997 with the Philadelphia Phillies. He was leading the team with 35 appearances when he was sent outright to Triple-A in June. He continued to play in the minors through 2000.
