= Chris Howard (catcher) =

American baseball player (born 1966)

- Catcher
- Born: February 27, 1966 (age 60); San Diego, California
- Batted: Right Threw: Right

MLB debut
- September 15, 1991, for the Seattle Mariners

Last MLB appearance
- August 10, 1994, for the Seattle Mariners

MLB statistics
- Batting average: .188
- Home runs: 0
- Runs batted in: 2
- Stats at Baseball Reference

Teams
- Seattle Mariners (1991, 1993–1994)

Career highlights and awards
- National champion (Football) (1985)

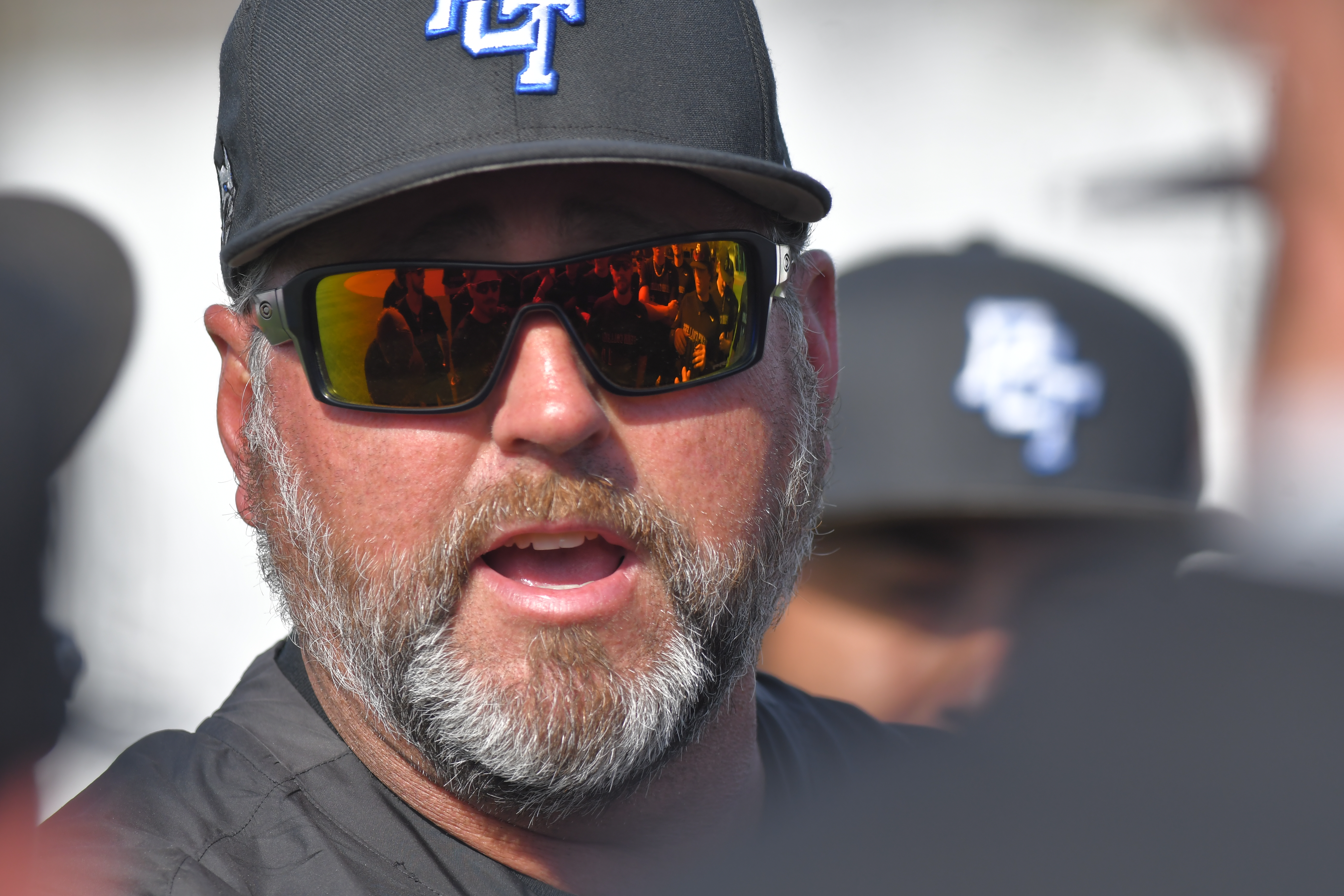
Chris Howard coaches the Wildcats during United East conference play

Christopher Hugh Howard (born February 27, 1966) is an American college baseball coach and former professional baseball catcher. He played in Major League Baseball (MLB) for the Seattle Mariners during three seasons in the early 1990s.

== Biography ==
Howard was born in San Diego, California and attended Bishop Miege High School in Roeland Park, Kansas.

Howard attended the University of Oklahoma on a football scholarship. He played for both the Sooners football and Sooners baseball teams, and was a fullback on the 1985 Oklahoma Sooners football team, the consensus national champions.

Howard later transferred to the University of Louisiana at Lafayette for one season. He was selected by the Seattle Mariners in 41st round of the 1988 MLB draft.

Howard began his professional baseball career in 1988 in the Mariners organization. He first reached the Double-A level in 1989 and the Triple-A level in 1991. He also made his MLB debut in 1991 as a September call-up, appearing in nine games for the Mariners; he was 1-for-6 at the plate for a .167 batting average. Howard spent most of the next five seasons playing in Triple-A. He played in four MLB games in 1993 and nine in 1994, all with the Mariners. He ended his playing career in 1996 with the Norfolk Tides, a Triple-A farm team of the New York Mets.

Overall, Howard appeared in 22 MLB games, batting .188 (6-for-32) with two runs batted in (RBIs). He also played in 790 games in Minor League Baseball (487 at the Triple-A level) where he batted .250 with 366 RBIs and 65 home runs.

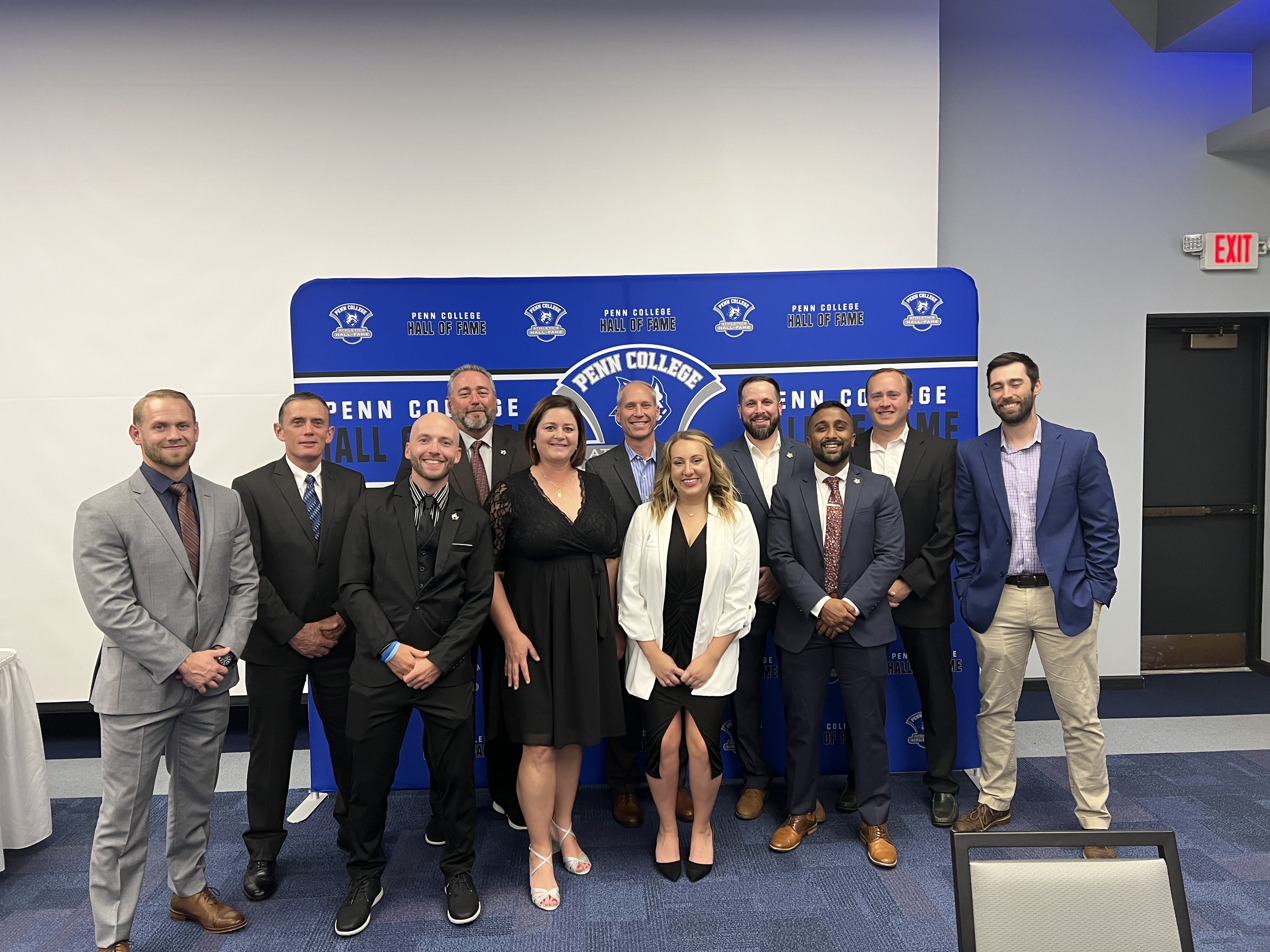

In 2007, Howard became head coach of the Pennsylvania College of Technology baseball team in Williamsport, Pennsylvania. In 2010, Howard played the role of a bench coach in the Japanese movie Baseball Dreams which was filmed in Williamsport. 2022 marked his 16th season as head coach. He was named United East Coach of the Year in 2023.
