= Dick Balderson =

American baseball player and executive

- Born: February 7, 1946 (age 80); Newport News, Virginia, U.S.
- Occupations: Baseball player, scout and executive
- Years active: 1968–2013

Richard Pendleton Balderson (born February 7, 1946) is an American former professional baseball player, front-office executive and scout. Born in Newport News, Virginia, Balderson was a longtime scouting and player development director. He was the general manager of the Seattle Mariners of Major League Baseball from October 8, 1985 through July 26, 1988.

== Playing career ==
Balderson was a minor league relief pitcher in his playing days. He graduated from the University of Richmond, where he starred in baseball for the Spiders and played varsity basketball, and signed with the Kansas City Royals in 1968, one year before the expansion team played its first MLB game. His active career lasted for eight years (1968–1975), all in the Royals farm system. Though he never reached Triple-A, 163 of his 234 games played were at the Double-A level. His career win–loss record was 32–21 with 22 saves.

== Executive career ==
In 1977, Balderson moved into the Royals' front office as assistant farm system director. In 1982, he became Kansas City's director of scouting and player development and one of general manager John Schuerholz' top aides. The Royals were then a power in the American League (AL) West division. In 1985, they won the AL pennant and World Series. Their success led George Argyros, owner of the sixth-place Seattle Mariners, to hire Balderson as his general manager. Balderson held the position through July 26, 1988. During his term, the team drafted future Baseball Hall of Famer Ken Griffey Jr. with the first overall selection in the 1987 Major League Baseball draft. Balderson also made one of the best trades in franchise history, when he acquired Jay Buhner from the New York Yankees for Ken Phelps on July 21, 1988. But the Mariners continued to struggle in the AL West standings during Balderson's tenure. They went 145–179 during 1986 and 1987, his first two seasons, and in 1988 stood at only 39–61 and in last place when Balderson was fired only five days after the Buhner trade.

Balderson remained in the game as a senior scouting and player development executive for the next 25 years. He was the scouting director of the Chicago Cubs in 1989–1990 and their director of player development in 1991–1992. He moved to the expansion Colorado Rockies as director of player development from 1993–1997 and then joined the Atlanta Braves as a special-assignment scout, reuniting him with Baseball Hall of Fame executive Schuerholz. Balderson spent the rest of his career with the Braves. He worked as their farm system and scouting director from 2000–2002, then returned to scouting and later became a special assistant to Frank Wren, Schuerholz' successor as general manager. Balderson retired in 2013.

Balderson was elected to the University of Richmond's Athletics Hall of Fame in 1994.

Preceded by Hal Keller	Seattle Mariners General Manager; 1986–1988	Succeeded by Woody Woodward
