= Roger Salkeld =

American baseball player (born 1971)

- Pitcher
- Born: March 6, 1971 (age 55); Burbank, California, U.S.
- Batted: Right Threw: Right

MLB debut
- September 8, 1993, for the Seattle Mariners

Last MLB appearance
- September 28, 1996, for the Cincinnati Reds

MLB statistics
- Win–loss record: 10–10
- Earned run average: 5.61
- Strikeouts: 141
- Stats at Baseball Reference

Teams
- Seattle Mariners (1993–1994); Cincinnati Reds (1996)

Roger William Salkeld (born March 6, 1971) is an American former professional baseball pitcher. Salkeld played Major League Baseball (MLB) for the Seattle Mariners in 1993 and 1994 and the Cincinnati Reds in 1996.

Sakeld attended Saugus High School in Santa Clarita, California. His senior season, he had a 13–1 record with 178 strikeouts in 108 2/3 innings pitched. The Mariners selected him in the first round, with the third overall selection of the 1989 MLB draft. He signed for a $225,000 signing bonus, the largest in franchise history at the time. Baseball America ranked him as a top 5 prospect in baseball entering the 1991 and 1992 seasons. He suffered a shoulder injury in spring training in 1992 that required surgery in October and kept him from pitching until June 1993.

Salkeld was a September call-up that year, making his MLB debut and pitching in three games. He made 13 starts for Seattle in 1994, going 2–5. While in the minors, the Mariners traded him to the Reds for Tim Belcher in May 1995. Salkeld returned to the majors with Cincinnati in 1996, pitching in a career-high 116 innings in his final MLB season.

Salkeld continued pitching in the minors, also living for the Mexico City Tigers in 1999. He became a full-time reliever, saying his surgically repaired shoulder was less effective if he threw a starter's workload. His career ended in 2000, with the Akron Aeros.

== Personal life ==
Salkeld is the grandson of Bill Salkeld, who played five years in MLB from 1945 to 1950.

Salkeld married his wife in 1993, and their daughter was born the following year.

After his playing career, Salkeld resided in Santa Clarita and was president of Skaggs Concrete Sawing.
