= Kevin King (baseball) =

American baseball player (born 1969)

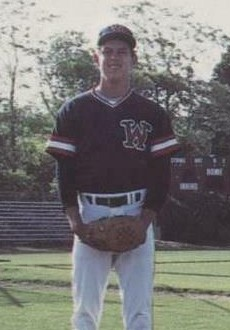
- Pitcher
- Born: February 11, 1969 (age 57); Atwater, California, U.S.
- Batted: Left Threw: Left

MLB debut
- September 2, 1993, for the Seattle Mariners

Last MLB appearance
- May 14, 1995, for the Seattle Mariners

MLB statistics
- Wins-Losses: 0–3
- Earned run average: 7.34
- Strikeouts: 17
- Stats at Baseball Reference

Teams
- Seattle Mariners (1993–1995)

Kevin Ray King (born February 11, 1969) is an American former professional baseball pitcher. He made 34 appearances, all in relief, over parts of three seasons in Major League Baseball (MLB), from 1993–1995, all with the Seattle Mariners. King attended Braggs High School and the University of Oklahoma.

== Amateur career ==
King attended Braggs High School in Braggs, Oklahoma. He was selected by the Toronto Blue Jays in the ninth round of the 1987 MLB draft, but did not sign. He instead attended the University of Oklahoma, where his teammates included future Major League players, Darron Cox and Matt Ruebel. King was a three-time letter winner from 1988 to 1990, as well as a 1989 All-District Honoree. He was selected to the 1988 All-Big Eight Conference Second Team and later the 1989 All-Big Eight Conference First Team. In 1988, he played collegiate summer baseball with the Wareham Gatemen of the Cape Cod Baseball League. After his junior season he was selected by the Seattle Mariners in the seventh round of the 1990 MLB draft.

== Professional career ==
=== Seattle Mariners ===
King began his professional career in 1990, splitting the season between the Short-Season Bellingham Mariners of the Northwest League and the Class-A Advanced Peninsula Pilots of the Carolina League. He went a combined 7–4 with a 4.61 ERA in 13 games, all starts. The next season, 1991, King played with the Class-A Advanced Peninsula Pilots for the entire season. He went 6–7 with a 4.37 ERA in 17 games, all starts. Amongst starters, King had the lowest ERA in the Pilots' rotation. In 1992, with the Class-A Advanced San Bernardino Spirit of the California League, King started the most games in his professional baseball career. In 27 games, all starts, King went 7–16 with a 5.31 ERA in 166 innings pitched. That season, he was first in the league in losses and was seventh in innings pitched. King split the 1993 season between the Class-A Advanced Riverside Pilots, the Double-A Jacksonville Suns and the Seattle Mariners. In the minor leagues, King went a combined 5–2 with a 2.16 ERA and 41 strikeouts in 42 games, all in relief. King made his major league debut on September 2, 1993, against the Milwaukee Brewers. In one inning pitched, King gave up no hits or runs. At the end of the season, King compiled a record of 0–1 with a 6.17 ERA and 8 strikeouts in 13 games. The next season, 1994, King started the season with the Mariners and registered a loss in the season opener against the Cleveland Indians. He went 0–2 with a 7.04 ERA in 19 games. In the minors, King played for the Triple-A Calgary Cannons of the Pacific Coast League. In 25 games with the Cannons, he went 1–2 with a 5.65 ERA in 362/3 innings pitched. King spent his final season in the Mariners organization in 1995. He split the season between Seattle, the Double-A Port City Roosters and the Triple-A Tacoma Rainiers. King spent spring training the Mariners in 1995. He played with the Mariners until his final major league appearance on May 14, 1995. With Seattle, King appeared in two games and gave up five earned runs. He was optioned to the minors on May 18, 1995. In the minors, King went a combined 1–2 with a 5.10 ERA in 36 games.

=== Amarillo Dillas ===
King spent his final season in professional baseball in 1996 with the non-affiliated, independent Amarillo Dillas of the Texas–Louisiana League. His teammates on the Dillas included two former major league players, Todd Burns and Lonnie Maclin. In four games, King gave up seven earned runs in 41/3 innings pitched.
