= Roeland Park, Kansas =

- City
- Location within Johnson County and Kansas
- Interactive map of Roeland Park, Kansas
- Coordinates: 39°02′09″N 94°38′15″W
- Country: United States
- State: Kansas
- County: Johnson
- Incorporated: 1951
- Named for: John Roe

Government
  - Mayor: Michael Poppa

Area
  - Total: 1.62 sq mi (4.19 km^{2})
  - Land: 1.62 sq mi (4.19 km^{2})
  - Water: 0 sq mi (0.00 km^{2})
- Elevation: 991 ft (302 m)

Population (2020)
  - Total: 6,871
  - Density: 4,250/sq mi (1,640/km^{2})
- Time zone: UTC-6 (CST)
  - Summer (DST): UTC-5 (CDT)
- ZIP Codes: 66205 and 66202
- Area code: 913
- FIPS code: 20-60825
- GNIS ID: 485646
- Website: roelandpark.net

Roeland Park is a city in Johnson County, Kansas, United States, and located within the Kansas City metropolitan area. As of the 2020 census, the population of the city was 6,871.

== History ==
The community was named after John Roe, an immigrant from Ireland who settled on 267 acres (1.08 km^{2}) in 1883, on part of which Roeland Park now stands. The Roe Home was built in 1891 and razed in 1958 to make room for the interchange at Roe Boulevard and Shawnee Mission Parkway.

The area that would become Roeland Park was first developed in 1905 as a streetcar suburb, known as Southridge, by William Strang. Strang's Missouri and Kansas Interurban Railway went through Roeland Park on its way from Rosedale to downtown Overland Park. Single-family home construction in this area accelerated during the late 1930s and 1940s as more developers subdivided land purchased from farmers.

Incorporation of the city of Roeland Park occurred on July 2, 1951, led by developer Charles Vawter and his Roeland Park Homes Association. A series of annexations occurred between 1951 and 1959 leading to the present-day city boundaries.

Roeland Park's original pool was built in 1958 on land donated by the Roe Estate. The new pool facility is located on the east side of the Community Center at 4843 Rosewood Drive. The Community Center address is 4850 Rosewood Drive and offers many different programs throughout the year. A fabric dome which covers the main pool is in place from September to May, allowing residents to use the main pool throughout the year.

In 2023, Michael Poppa was appointed mayor, becoming the first openly gay mayor of any large city in Johnson County. Poppa succeeded previous mayor, Mike Kelly, who was elected chairman of the Johnson County board of commissioners.

== Geography ==
According to the United States Census Bureau, the city has a total area of 1.62 square miles (4.20 km^{2}), all land.

== Demographics ==
Historical population
Census	Pop.	Note	%±
1960	8,949		—
1970	9,760		9.1%
1980	7,962		−18.4%
1990	7,706		−3.2%
2000	6,817		−11.5%
2010	6,731		−1.3%
2020	6,871		2.1%
U.S. Decennial Census; 2010-2020

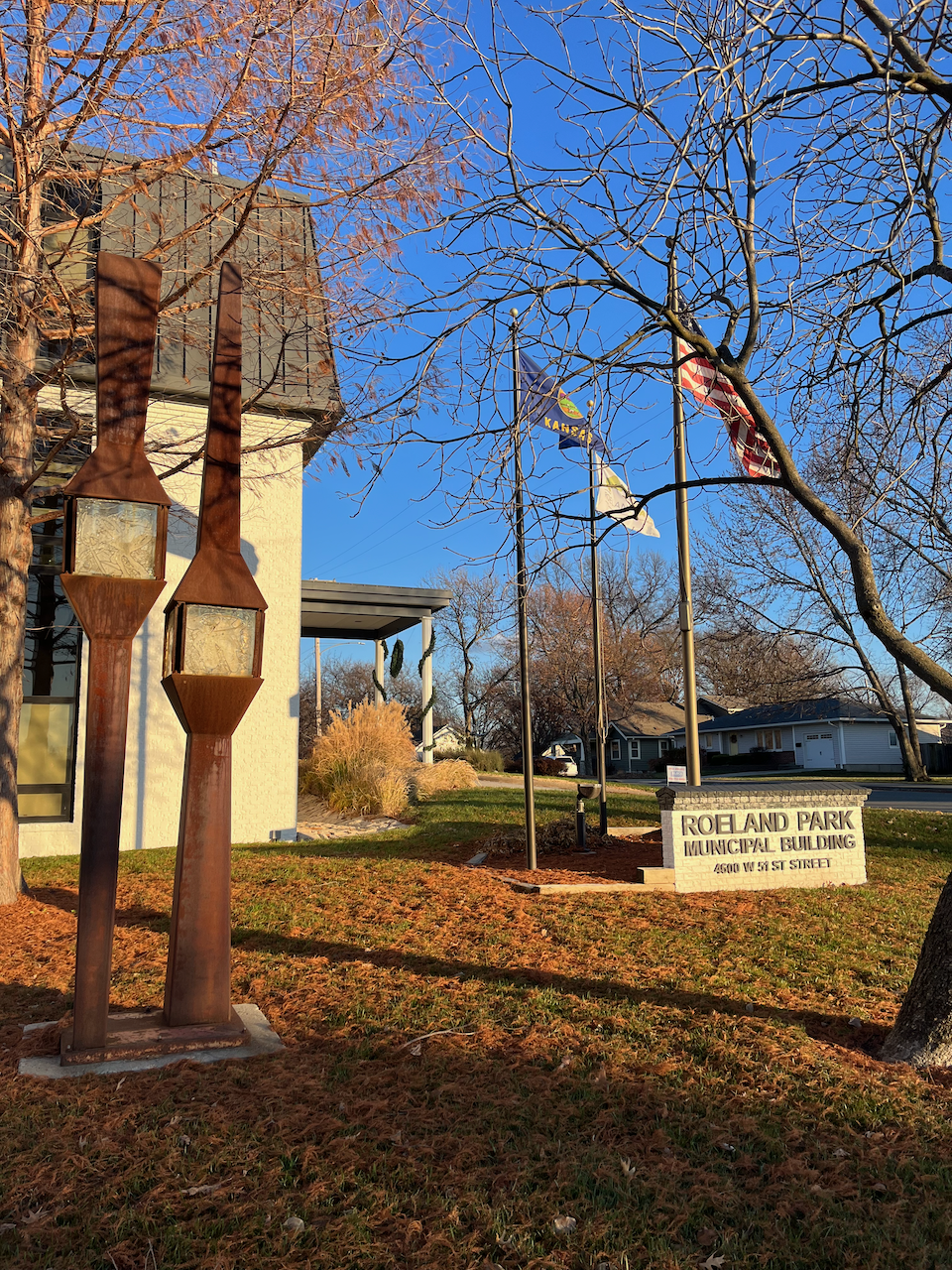
Roeland Park City Hall (2023)

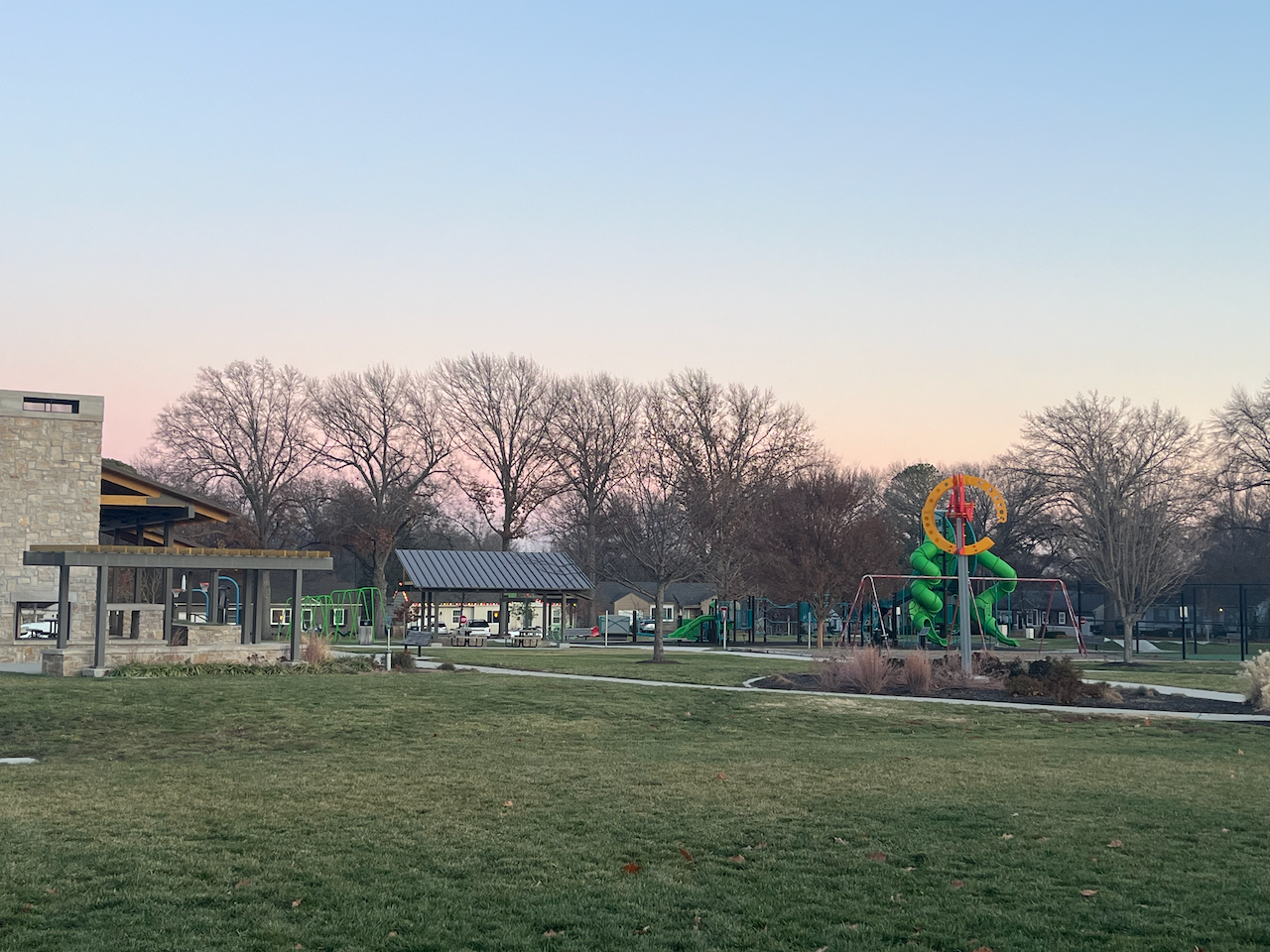
Roeland Park at dusk (2023)

=== Racial and ethnic composition ===
Roeland Park city, Kansas – Racial and ethnic composition Note: the US Census treats Hispanic/Latino as an ethnic category. This table excludes Latinos from the racial categories and assigns them to a separate category. Hispanics/Latinos may be of any race.
Race / Ethnicity (NH = Non-Hispanic)	Pop 2000	Pop 2010	Pop 2020	% 2000	% 2010	% 2020
White alone (NH)	6,022	5,519	5,276	88.34%	81.99%	76.79%
Black or African American alone (NH)	130	232	242	1.91%	3.45%	3.52%
Native American or Alaska Native alone (NH)	28	24	24	0.41%	0.36%	0.35%
Asian alone (NH)	97	102	134	1.42%	1.52%	1.95%
Native Hawaiian or Pacific Islander alone (NH)	7	2	11	0.10%	0.03%	0.16%
Other race alone (NH)	8	5	49	0.12%	0.07%	0.71%
Mixed race or Multiracial (NH)	72	149	312	1.06%	2.21%	4.54%
Hispanic or Latino (any race)	453	698	823	6.65%	10.37%	11.98%
Total	6,817	6,731	6,871	100.00%	100.00%	100.00%

=== 2020 census ===
As of the 2020 census, Roeland Park had a population of 6,871, including 3,201 households and 1,668 families. The population density was 4,241.4 inhabitants per square mile (1,639.9/km^{2}).

The median age was 34.5 years. 18.0% of residents were under the age of 18 and 13.8% were 65 years of age or older. For every 100 females there were 96.4 males, and for every 100 females age 18 and over there were 91.5 males age 18 and over.

100.0% of residents lived in urban areas, while 0.0% lived in rural areas.

Of the 3,201 households, 23.9% had children under the age of 18 living in them. 39.5% were married-couple households, 20.8% were households with a male householder and no spouse or partner present, and 30.5% were households with a female householder and no spouse or partner present. About 33.1% of all households were made up of individuals, and 9.1% had someone living alone who was 65 years of age or older.

There were 3,315 housing units, of which 3.4% were vacant. The homeowner vacancy rate was 0.8% and the rental vacancy rate was 4.1%.

Racial composition as of the 2020 census
Race	Number	Percent
White	5,530	80.5%
Black or African American	255	3.7%
American Indian and Alaska Native	29	0.4%
Asian	135	2.0%
Native Hawaiian and Other Pacific Islander	12	0.2%
Some other race	277	4.0%
Two or more races	633	9.2%

=== Income and poverty ===
The 2016–2020 5-year American Community Survey estimates show that the median household income was $73,786 (with a margin of error of +/- $8,457) and the median family income $87,727 (+/- $12,353). Males had a median income of $55,417 (+/- $10,368) versus $39,659 (+/- $10,836) for females. The median income for those above 16 years old was $45,406 (+/- $5,076). Approximately, 10.8% of families and 12.3% of the population were below the poverty line, including 9.5% of those under the age of 18 and 11.1% of those ages 65 or over.

=== 2010 census ===
As of the census of 2010, there were 6,731 people, 3,065 households, and 1,732 families living in the city. The population density was 4,154.9 inhabitants per square mile (1,604.2/km^{2}). There were 3,282 housing units at an average density of 2,025.9 per square mile (782.2/km^{2}). The racial makeup of the city was 87.6% White, 3.7% African American, 0.4% Native American, 1.5% Asian, 3.8% from other races, and 3.0% from two or more races. Hispanic or Latino of any race were 10.4% of the population.

There were 3,065 households, of which 26.6% had children under the age of 18 living with them, 42.2% were married couples living together, 10.4% had a female householder with no husband present, 3.9% had a male householder with no wife present, and 43.5% were non-families. 33.0% of all households were made up of individuals, and 7.7% had someone living alone who was 65 years of age or older. The average household size was 2.20 and the average family size was 2.82.

The median age in the city was 34.1 years. 20% of residents were under the age of 18; 8.4% were between the ages of 18 and 24; 36% were from 25 to 44; 24.5% were from 45 to 64; and 11.1% were 65 years of age or older. The gender makeup of the city was 48.4% male and 51.6% female.

== Education ==
The community is served by Shawnee Mission USD 512 public school district.

Roesland Elementary School, St. Agnes Elementary School and Bishop Miege High School are all located within the city.

=== Libraries ===
The Johnson County Library serves residents of Roeland Park. The library's Cedar Roe branch is in Roeland Park.

== Notable people ==
Notable individuals who were born in and/or have lived in Roeland Park include:

- John D. Carmack (1970- ), computer programmer, co-founder of video game company id Software
- Sharice Davids (1980- ), member of the United States House of Representatives from Kansas's 3rd congressional district
- Catherine Fox (1977- ), swimmer, winner of two gold medals at the 1996 Olympics in Atlanta, Georgia
- Mike Gardner (1967- ), football coach
- Nia Williams (1990- ), soccer defender
- Phil McGraw (1950- ), television personality and author, lived in Roeland Park during high school and married his first wife at the former Southridge Presbyterian Church
- Ardie Davis, barbecue judge
