= Rogers Centre =

Sports stadium in Toronto, Canada

- SkyDome

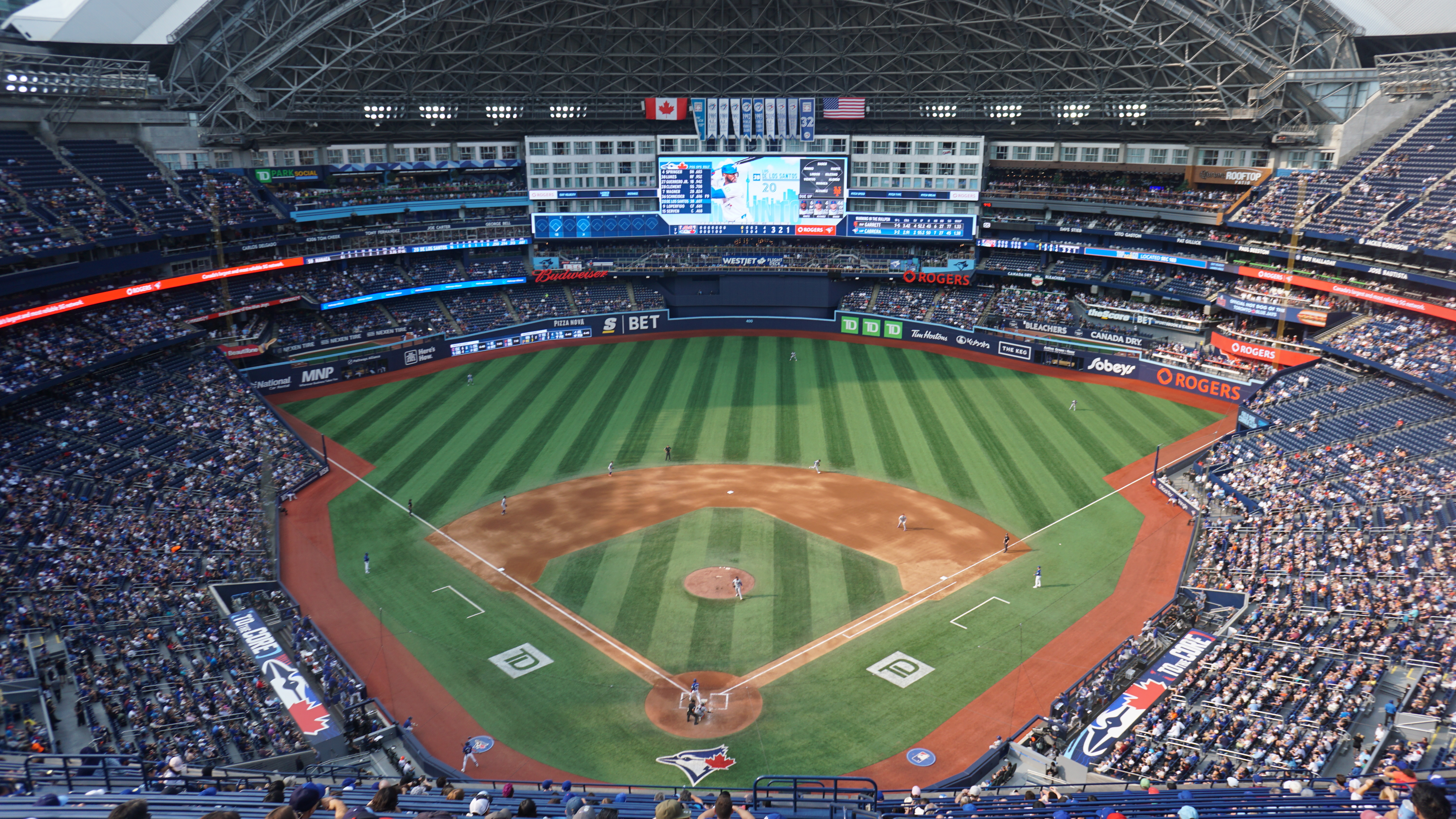
- Rogers Centre in 2024

- Location in Toronto Location in Southern Ontario Location in Ontario Location in Canada
- Former names: SkyDome (1989–2005)
- Address: 1 Blue Jays Way
- Location: Toronto, Ontario, Canada
- Coordinates: 43°38′29″N 79°23′21″W
- Owner: Rogers Communications
- Operator: Rogers Stadium Limited Partnership
- Capacity: Baseball: 39,150; Concerts: 10,000–55,000
- Surface: AstroTurf (1989–2004); FieldTurf (2005–2010); AstroTurf GameDay Grass 3D (2010–2014); AstroTurf 3D Xtreme (2015); AstroTurf 3D Xtreme with dirt infield (2016–present)
- Record attendance: 68,237 (WrestleMania X8, March 17, 2002)
- Field size: Left field line – 328 ft (100 m); Left-centre – 368 ft (112 m); Left-centre power alley – 381 ft (116 m); Centre field – 400 ft (120 m); Right-centre power alley – 372 ft (113 m); Right-centre – 359 ft (109 m); Right field line – 328 ft (100 m); Backstop – 60 ft (18 m)
- Public transit: Union Station; Union subway GO Bus Terminal; 509 Harbourfront; 510 Spadina

Construction
- Groundbreaking: October 3, 1986
- Opened: June 3, 1989 (as SkyDome)
- Renovated: 2022–2024
- Cost: $570 million $400 million (2022–2024 renovation)
- Architects: Rod Robbie, Robbie Adjeleian NORR Consortium (1989); Populous (2024 renovation)
- Structural engineer: Adjeleian Allen Rubeli Ltd.
- Services engineer: The Mitchell Partnership Inc.
- General contractor: EllisDon Construction

Tenants
- Toronto Blue Jays (MLB) (1989–2019, 2021–present); Toronto Argonauts (CFL) (1989–2015); Toronto Raptors (NBA) (1995–1999); International Bowl (NCAA) (2007–2010)

Website
- mlb.com/bluejays/ballpark

Rogers Centre (originally SkyDome) is a retractable roof stadium in downtown Toronto, Ontario, Canada, situated at the base of the CN Tower near the northern shore of Lake Ontario. Opened in 1989 on the former Railway Lands, it is home to the Toronto Blue Jays of Major League Baseball (MLB). As well as being improved over the decades, during the MLB offseasons of 2022–24, the stadium was renovated by upgrading the sports facilities and hospitality whilst reducing the capacity for baseball games. While it is primarily a sports venue, the stadium also hosts other large events such as conventions, trade fairs, concerts, travelling carnivals, circuses and monster truck shows.

Previously, the stadium was also home to the Toronto Argonauts of the Canadian Football League (CFL) and the Toronto Raptors of the National Basketball Association (NBA). The Buffalo Bills of the National Football League (NFL) played an annual game at the stadium as part of the Bills Toronto Series from 2008 to 2013. The stadium served as the site of both the opening and closing ceremonies of the 2015 Pan American Games (renamed the Pan-Am Dome or Pan-Am Ceremonies Venue due to sponsorship regulations).

The stadium was renamed "Rogers Centre" following the 2005 purchase of the stadium by Rogers Communications, the corporation that also owns the Toronto Blue Jays. Despite the name change, the stadium is still commonly referred to as SkyDome in informal contexts among fans. The venue is noted for being the first stadium to have a fully retractable motorized roof, as well as for the 348-room hotel attached to it with 70 rooms overlooking the field. It is the last North American major-league stadium built to accommodate both football and baseball.

== History ==
=== Background and design ===
The idea of building a domed stadium can be traced back to the bid that Toronto lost to Montreal as the Canadian candidate city for the 1976 Summer Olympics. In the proposal, an 80,000–100,000 seat complex would be part of the planned Harbour City development on the site of Maple Leaf Stadium.

The contemporary impetus for building an enclosed sports venue in Toronto came following the Grey Cup game in November 1982, held at the outdoor Exhibition Stadium. The game, in which the hometown Toronto Argonauts (also known as the Argos) were making their first Grey Cup appearance since 1971, was played in a driving rainstorm that left most of the crowd drenched, leading the media to call it "the Rain Bowl". As many of the seats were completely exposed to the elements, thousands watched the game from the concession section. To make a bad experience even worse, the washrooms overflowed. In attendance that day was Bill Davis, the Premier of Ontario, and the poor conditions were seen by the largest television audience in Canada (over 7.862 million viewers) to that point. The following day, at a rally for the Argos at Toronto City Hall, tens of thousands of people who attended the game began to chant, "We want a dome! We want a dome!"

Seven months later, in June 1983, Davis formally announced a three-person committee would look into the feasibility of building a domed stadium at Exhibition Place. The committee consisted of Paul Godfrey, Larry Grossman and former Ontario Hydro chairman Hugh Macaulay.

The committee examined various projects, including a large indoor stadium at Exhibition Place with an air-supported dome, similar to BC Place in Vancouver. In 1985, an international design competition was launched to design a new stadium, along with selection of a site. Some of the proposed sites included Exhibition Place, Downsview Airport, and York University. The final site was at the base of the CN Tower not far from Union Station, a major railway and transit hub. The Railway Lands were a major Canadian National Railway rail switching yard encompassing the CNR Spadina Roundhouse (the desolate downtown lands were part of a master plan for revitalizing the area, which includes CityPlace). Ultimately, the Robbie/Allen concept won because it provided the largest roof opening of all the finalists, and it was the most technically sound.

The stadium was designed by architect Rod Robbie and structural engineer Michael Allen and was constructed by the EllisDon Construction company of London, Ontario and the Dominion Bridge Company of Lachine, Quebec. The stadium's construction lasted about 2 1/2 years, from October 1986 to May 1989. The approximate cost of construction was C$570 million ($1.25 billion in 2025 dollars) which was paid for by the federal government, Ontario provincial government, the City of Toronto, and a large consortium of corporations.

=== Financing ===
The stadium was funded by a public–private partnership, with the government paying the largest percentage of the cost. The initial cost of $150 million was greatly underestimated, as the final cost was C$570 million ($1.25 billion in 2025 dollars). Two levels of government (Metro Toronto and provincial) each initially contributed $30 million ($65.9 million in 2025 dollars). This does not include the value of the land that the stadium sits on, which was owned by the Canada Lands Company (a Crown corporation of Canada) and the City of Toronto and was leased for $900,000 a year through 2088. Canada's three main breweries (Labatt's, Molson, and Carling O'Keefe) and the Toronto Blue Jays each paid $5 million ($11 million in 2025 dollars) to help fund the stadium. An additional 26 other Canadian corporations (selected by invitation only) also contributed $5 million, for which they received one of the 161 Skyboxes with four parking spaces (for ten years, with an opportunity for renewal) and a 99-year exclusive option on stadium advertising. The initial cost of leasing a Skybox ranged from $150,000 to $225,000 ($329,278 to $493,917 in 2025 dollars) a year in 1989 – plus the cost of tickets for all events.

The then unusual financing structure created controversy. First of all, there was no public tender for supplies and equipment. Secondly, companies that paid the $5 million fee, such as Coca-Cola, TSN and CIBC, received 100 percent stadium exclusivity, including advertising rights, for the life of their contract that could be extended up to 99 years. Third, the contracts were not put up for bid, meaning there was some doubt the contracts were made at a market rate: Pepsi stated at the time that had it known the terms of the contract it would have paid far more than $5 million for the rights. Local media like NOW Magazine called the amount charged to the companies "scandalously low".

=== Construction ===
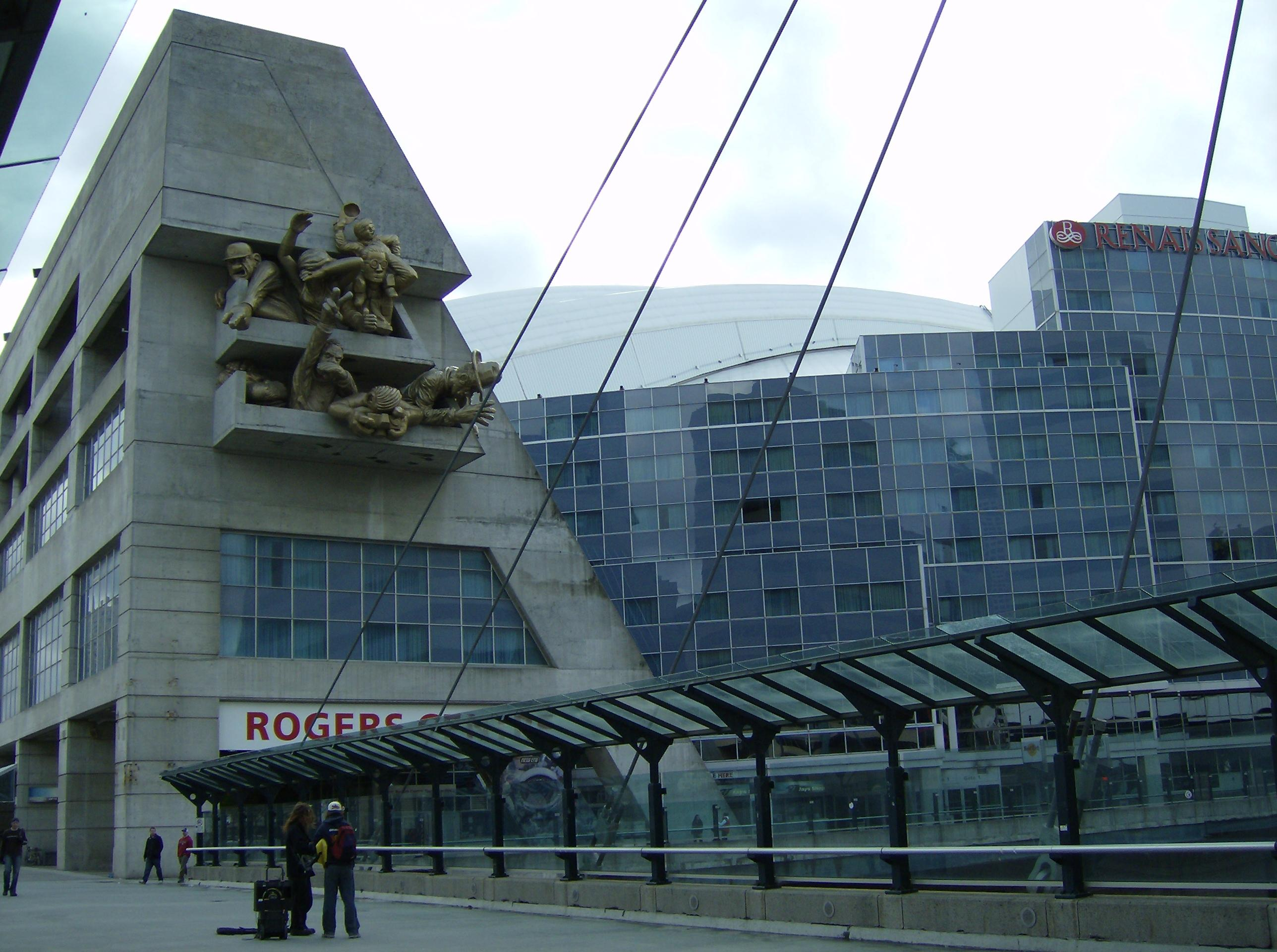
A cable-stayed bridge was built over the Union Station Rail Corridor next to the stadium connecting it to the foot of John Street. Stadium-goers, pedestrians and cyclists use the bridge, while hot dog stands are set up on it.

Construction of the Ontario Stadium Project was spearheaded by lead contractor EllisDon. Several factors complicated the construction: The lands housed a functioning water pumping station that needed to be relocated, the soil was contaminated from a century of industrial use, railway buildings needed to be torn down or moved, and the site was rich with archaeological finds. One of the most complex issues was moving the John Street pumping station across the street to the south of the stadium. Foundations to the stadium were being poured even as the facility (in the infield area) continued to function, as construction on its new location had yet to be completed.

Because the stadium was the first of its kind in the world, the architects and engineers kept the design simple (by using a sturdy dome shape) and used proven technologies to move the roof. It was important the design would work and be reliable as to avoid the various problems that plagued Montreal's Olympic Stadium. The 31-storey-high roof consists of four panels: one (on the north end) is fixed in place and the other three are moved by electrically driven 'train' engines, that run on high-strength railway rails. The roof, which takes 20 minutes to open, was made out of steel trusses covered by corrugated steel cladding, which in turn is covered by a single-ply PVC membrane.

Because of its location south of the major railway corridor, new pedestrian connections had to be built; the infrastructure was part of the reason for the high cost of the stadium. The SkyWalk is an approximately 500-metre (1,600 ft) enclosed walkway that leads from the base of the CN Tower and via a bridge connects to Union Station (and is part of the Path network). The John Street cable-stayed bridge was built to provide north–south passage over the rail tracks, linking Front Street with the stadium.

Construction at the site, which at one time was south of the shoreline, unearthed over 1,500 artifacts. These included a 200-year-old French cannon used as ballast for a ship, cannonballs, pottery and a telescope. The stadium was completed two months late, having been planned to open for the first regular season game of the 1989 Toronto Blue Jays season; the team played the first two months of its home schedule at Exhibition Stadium that year.

=== Naming ===
SkyDome wordmark (1989–2005)

The official name prior to and during construction was the 'Ontario Stadium Project' but was widely referred to in local media as simply 'the Dome' or 'Toronto Domed stadium'. As completion neared, the name "SkyDome" was chosen as part of a province-wide "name the stadium" contest in 1987. Sponsored by the Toronto Sun, ballots were offered for people to submit their suggested name, with lifetime seats behind home plate to all events at the stadium (including concerts) as the prize. Over 150,000 entries were received with 12,897 different names. The selection committee narrowed it down to four choices: "Towerdome", "Harbourdome", "SkyDome", and simply "the Dome". The judges' final selection was SkyDome. Premier David Peterson drew the prize-winning entry of Kellie Watson from a lottery barrel containing the over-2,000 entries that proposed "SkyDome". At the press conference announcing the name, Chuck Magwood, president of the Stadium Corporation of Ontario (Stadco), the crown corporation created to run SkyDome, commented: "The sky is a huge part of the whole roof process. The name has a sense of the infinite and that's what this is all about." Kellie Watson received lifetime seating of choice at SkyDome, which is still honoured after the stadium was renamed to Rogers Centre, under new ownership.

=== Opening ===
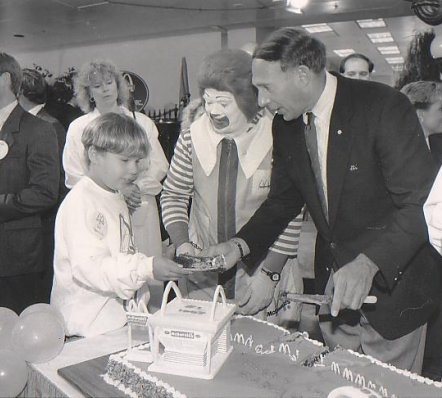
Opening of the 600th McDonald's Canada location at the SkyDome in August 1989 with a performer in a Ronald McDonald costume in attendance; the McDonald's location has since been replaced.

The stadium was intended to be ready in time for Opening Day of the 1989 Toronto Blue Jays season. However, due to construction delays caused in part by widespread construction worker strikes across Ontario, this was postponed and the Blue Jays began their season at Exhibition Stadium. The stadium officially opened on June 3, 1989, and hosted an official grand opening show: "The Opening of SkyDome: A Celebration", broadcast on CBC Television the following evening hosted by Brian Williams. With a crowd of over 50,000 in attendance, the event included appearances by Alan Thicke, Oscar Peterson (no relation to David), Andrea Martin of SCTV, impressionist André-Philippe Gagnon and rock band Glass Tiger. The roof was ceremonially "opened" by Ontario Premier David Peterson with a laser pen. The roof's opening exposed the crowd to a downpour of rain. Despite audible chants of "close the roof", Magwood insisted the roof remain fully open.

=== Financial problems and fallout ===
The stadium became a thorn in the side of David Peterson's Ontario Liberal government for repeated cost overruns. After the Liberals were defeated by the NDP in the 1990 Ontario election, a review by the new Bob Rae government in October 1990 revealed Stadco's debt meant the Dome would have to be booked 600 days a year to turn a profit, almost twice as many days as there are days in a calendar year. The stadium income was only $17 million in its first year of operations, while debt service was $40 million. It was determined the abrupt late inclusion by Stadco of a hotel and health club added an additional $112 million to the cost of the building.

As the province slipped into a recession, Rae appointed University of Toronto professor Bruce Kidd and Canadian Auto Workers President Bob White to the Stadco board to help deal with the stadium's growing debt, but the original $165 million debt had increased to $400 million by 1993. Stadco became a political liability, and in March 1994, the Ontario government paid off all outstanding Stadco debts from the government treasury and sold the stadium for $151 million to a private consortium that included Labatt Breweries, the Blue Jays' owner.

In November 1998, the stadium, which Labatt then owned as 49 percent of total, filed for bankruptcy protection, triggered after disastrous Skybox renewal numbers. Most of the 161 Skybox tenants had signed on for 10-year leases; a marked decrease in interest in the stadium's teams and the construction of the Air Canada Centre, which hosted the Toronto Maple Leafs and Toronto Raptors, resulted in few renewals for Skybox leases. That same month, the Blue Jays re-signed for an additional ten years in the facility.

In April 1999, Sportsco International LP bought the stadium out of bankruptcy protection for $80 million.

=== Purchase and renaming ===
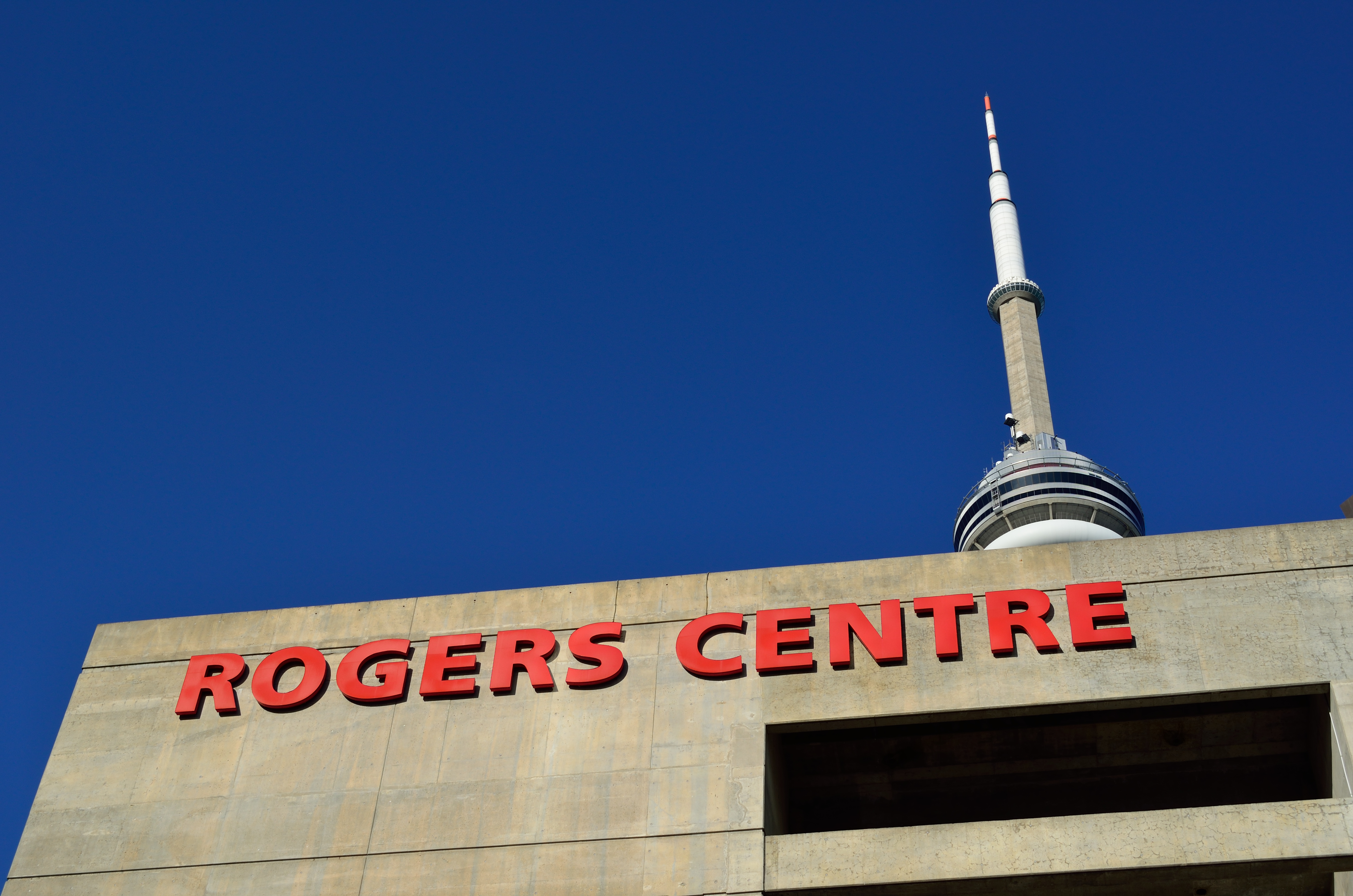
Rogers Centre wordmark on the exterior of the stadium. The stadium was renamed in 2005.

In November 2004, Rogers Communications, parent company of the Blue Jays, acquired SkyDome, excluding the attached SkyDome hotel, which had been sold to Renaissance for a reported $31 million in 1999, from Sportsco for about $25 million – roughly four percent of the cost of construction.

On February 2, 2005, Ted Rogers, President and CEO of Rogers Communications, announced a three-year corporate contract to change the name of SkyDome to Rogers Centre. The name change remains controversial and is unpopular with many fans, most of whom continue to refer to it as SkyDome in opposition to increased commercialism from the purchase of naming rights. One example is a 25,000-name petition started by TTC bus driver Randy Rajmoolie. A baseball diamond in Toronto's Trinity Bellwoods Park is officially named SkyDome after the stadium's former and popular name.

After the purchase, Rogers refurbished the stadium by, among other things, replacing the Jumbotron with a Daktronics video display, and erecting other new monitors, including several built into the outfield wall. They also installed a new FieldTurf artificial playing surface.

In May 2005, the Toronto Argonauts agreed to three five-year leases at Rogers Centre, which could have seen the Argonauts play out of Rogers Centre up to and including 2019. The team had the option to leave at the end of each of the three lease agreements. Proposed plans to lock Rogers Centre into its baseball configuration permanently in order to install a natural grass surface forced the Argonauts to relocate to BMO Field before the 2016 season.

In November 2005, Rogers Centre received a complete makeover to "open" the 100 Level concourse to the playing field and convert 43 luxury boxes to "party suites". This required some seats to be removed, which decreased overall capacity.

In April 2006, Rogers Centre became one of the first buildings of its size to adopt a completely smoke-free policy in Canada, anticipating an act of provincial legislature that required all Ontario public places to go smoke-free by June 1, 2006.

Alcohol was not available to patrons of Rogers Centre on April 7, 2009, as the Alcohol and Gaming Commission of Ontario (AGCO) imposed the first of a three-day alcohol suspension at the stadium for "infractions (that) took place at certain past events", according to the press release.

=== Major renovation in the 2020s ===
By 2020, with the Rogers Centre over 30 years old and one of the oldest active stadiums in MLB, Rogers had begun to explore options for the long-term home of the team. Rogers Communications and Brookfield Asset Management reportedly discussed replacing Rogers Centre with a smaller, baseball-specific stadium plus residential towers, office buildings, retail stores and public space. The new venue would be constructed on the southern end of the current stadium and adjacent parking lots, while the mixed-use development would be built on the northern portion of the site. An alternate site was also considered for a new baseball park at Quayside in Toronto's east end next to Lake Ontario.

However, the Blue Jays instead decided to undertake a major $400 million renovation of the stadium's interior in two phases, during the 2022–23 and 2023–24 offseasons. The objective of the renovations was to extend the ballpark's shelf life by another 10–15 years, while continuing to plan for a new stadium or more significant rebuild of the Rogers Centre within the next 10 to 12 years.

==== 2022–2023 ====
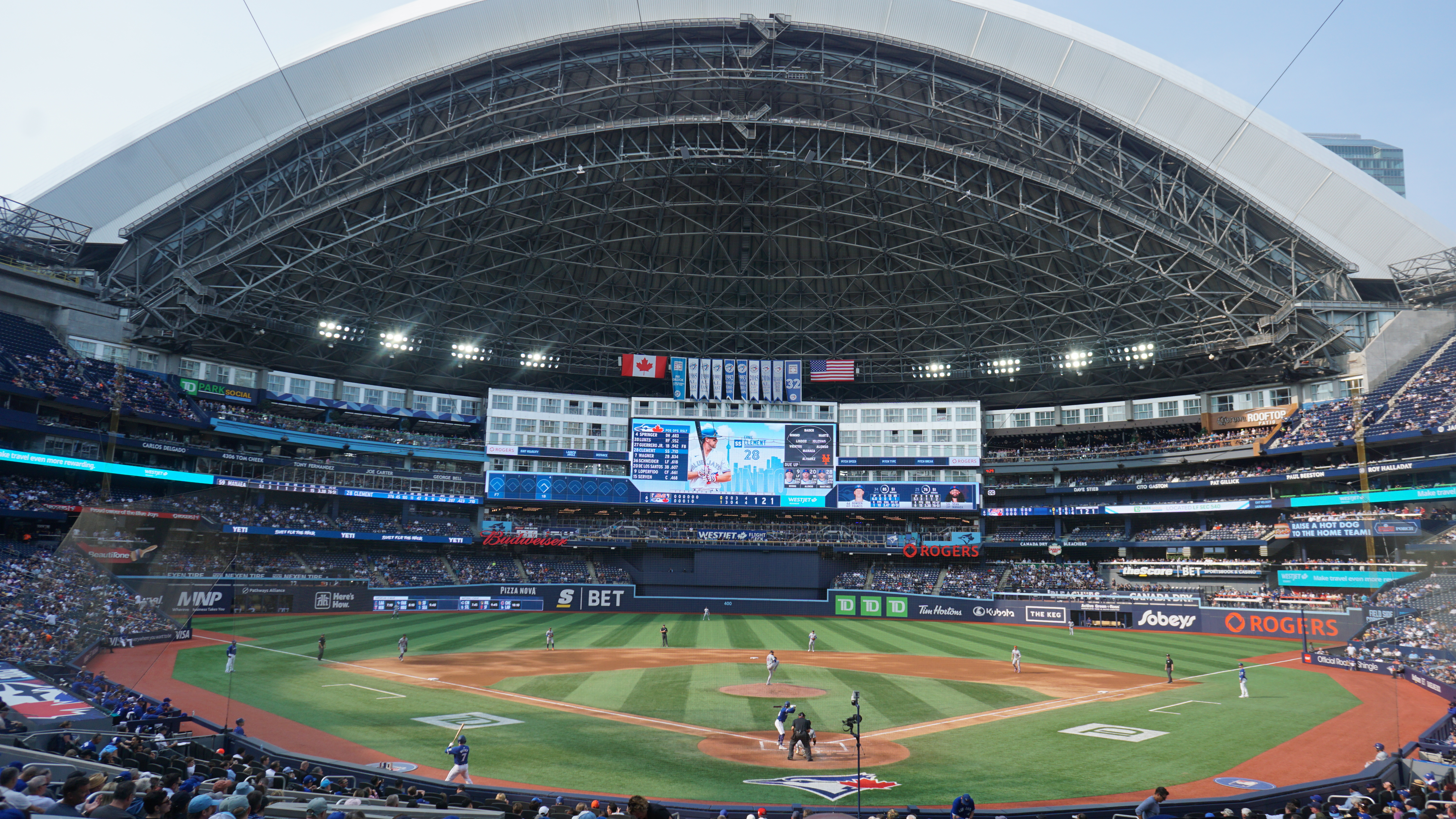
Interior after the second phase of renovations in 2024

The first phase of the renovations was designed by Populous and involved re-orienting outfield seats to face home plate, raising bullpens, adjusting the outfield dimensions to be asymmetrical, adding social spaces with bars in the outfield sections of the 500 Level (the highest level), and removing some seats to widen all remaining seats, thereby reducing capacity to 41,500 attendees. The 2023 Blue Jays home opener was moved a few days later to accommodate the first phase of the renovation.

==== 2023–2024 ====
The second phase involved re-orienting the infield seats to face home plate, the addition of cupholders to the seats in the 100 Level, as well as reducing the size of foul territory, improving the dugouts for the Blue Jays and their opponents, and the addition of LED backstop advertising to cover the entire backstop, which is much more visible during television broadcasts. Following the second phase, capacity of the stadium was reduced further to 39,150. The 2024 Blue Jays home opener was also moved a few days later to accommodate the second phase of the renovation.

=== List of improvements ===
Significant improvements to the facility since opening in 1989 include:

- Exterior roof lighting that can be programmed for themes and events.
- The Blue Jays clubhouse was substantially renovated, including a larger training room, an open concept lounge and personal lockers. In total, the clubhouse expanded from 12,000 to 24,000 square feet (1,100 to 2,200 m^{2}).
- Main level concourse expansion, making the space brighter, more fan-friendly with expanded wheelchair seating.
- The FieldTurf was upgraded to AstroTurf Gameday Grass for 2010.
- The main video board was upgraded in 2005, from a JumboTron to a modern Daktronics video board, measuring 33 by 110 feet (10 by 34 m).
- Jays Shop – Stadium Edition, was expanded to an 8,000-square-foot (740 m^{2}) retail space along the main concourse (2007).
- Two video boards were built into the outfield fence that each measure 10 by 65 feet (3 by 20 m). These boards provide player stats, out-of-town scores and other information related to the game and league.
- A continuous, ribbon-style video board was installed on the facing of the 300 Level, providing statistics and scores.
- Installation of 150 new 42-inch (1.07 m) flat-screen video monitors in the main- and second-level concourses, bringing the number of stadium monitors to around 300.
- Upgrade of the entire field lighting system in a two-month conversion process with all 840 of the 2,000-watt bowl lights replaced.
- A centre-field porch (later named the WestJet Flight Deck) in the 200 Level was added following the removal of the windows of the former Windows Restaurant (2013, $2 million).
- The AstroTurf Gameday Grass was upgraded to AstroTurf Gameday Grass 3D Extreme for the 2015 season.
- A full dirt infield was installed for 2016; for the previous six seasons, Rogers Centre was the only MLB ballpark with sliding pits.
- A two-year, $10 million roof upgrade, completed for the 2017 season, updated the aging OT network and control system to speed up the opening and closing process, reduce monitoring staff requirements, and added a rooftop weather station to better predict incoming weather systems.
- A new AstroTurf field was installed prior to the 2021 season. The new turf is attached to the floor, so the stands will no longer be able to be rolled and will be permanently locked into baseball configuration.
- Further lighting and video board upgrades were made for the 2022 season.
- For the 2024 The Eras Tour by Taylor Swift, new antennas were installed in the Rogers Centre for 5G cellular service, at a cost of $8 million. The stadium street address was also renamed "1 Taylor Swift Way" specifically for the concerts.
- For the 2026 season, the Hall of Excellence was installed at the 100 level concourse behind right field as part of the Blue Jays' 50th season. This Hall of Excellence features displays placed throughout the ballpark commemorating team and player accomplishments with various pieces of memorabilia, including the 1992 and 1993 World Series Commissioner's Trophies. Other items include game-worn jerseys, balls, programs, tickets, bases and more. It officially opened upon the induction of Sportsnet colour commentator Buck Martinez on August 29 of that year.

== Stadium features ==
=== Retractable roof ===
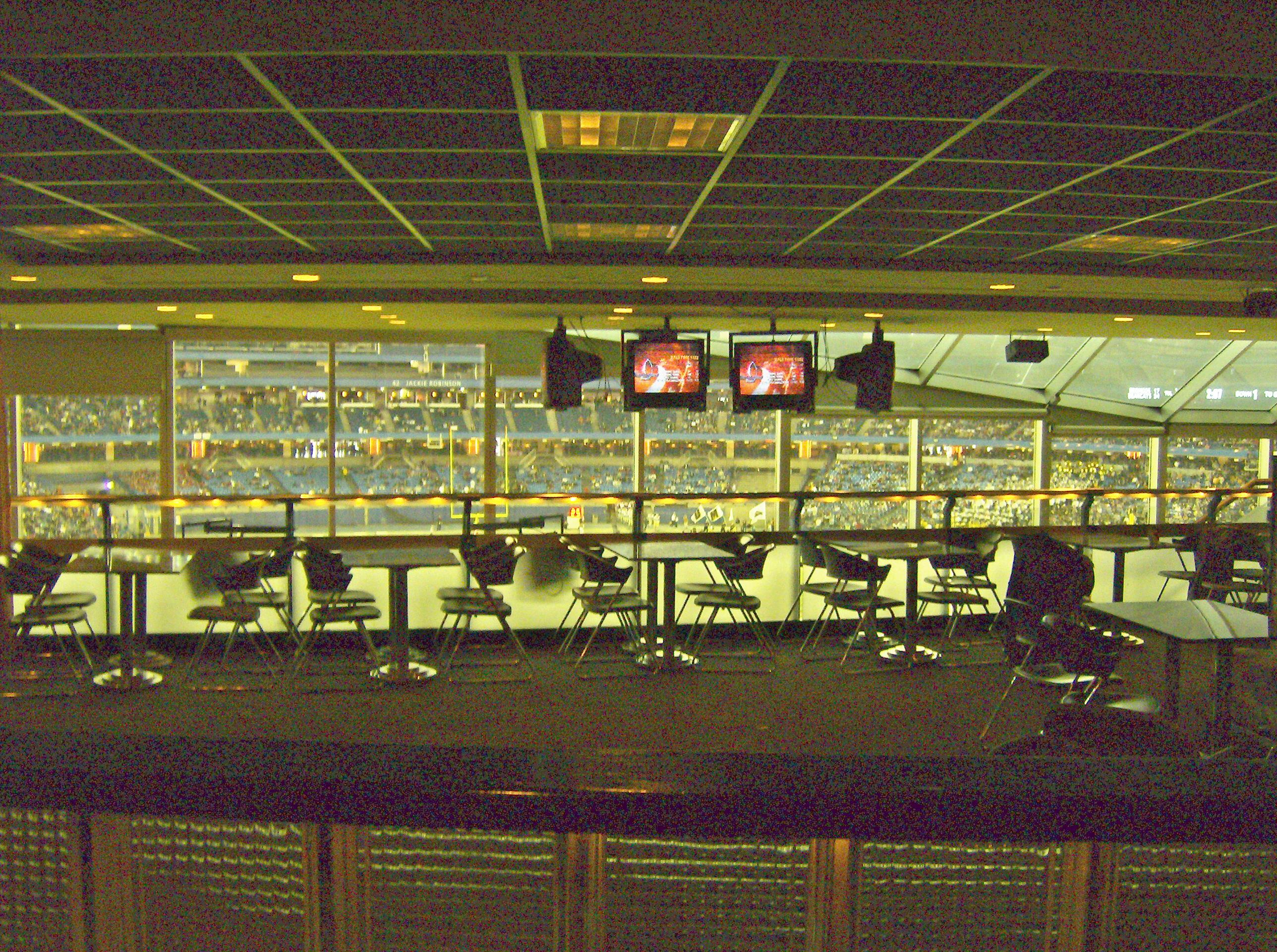
Several restaurants have views of events. The former Windows restaurant looked onto the playing field.

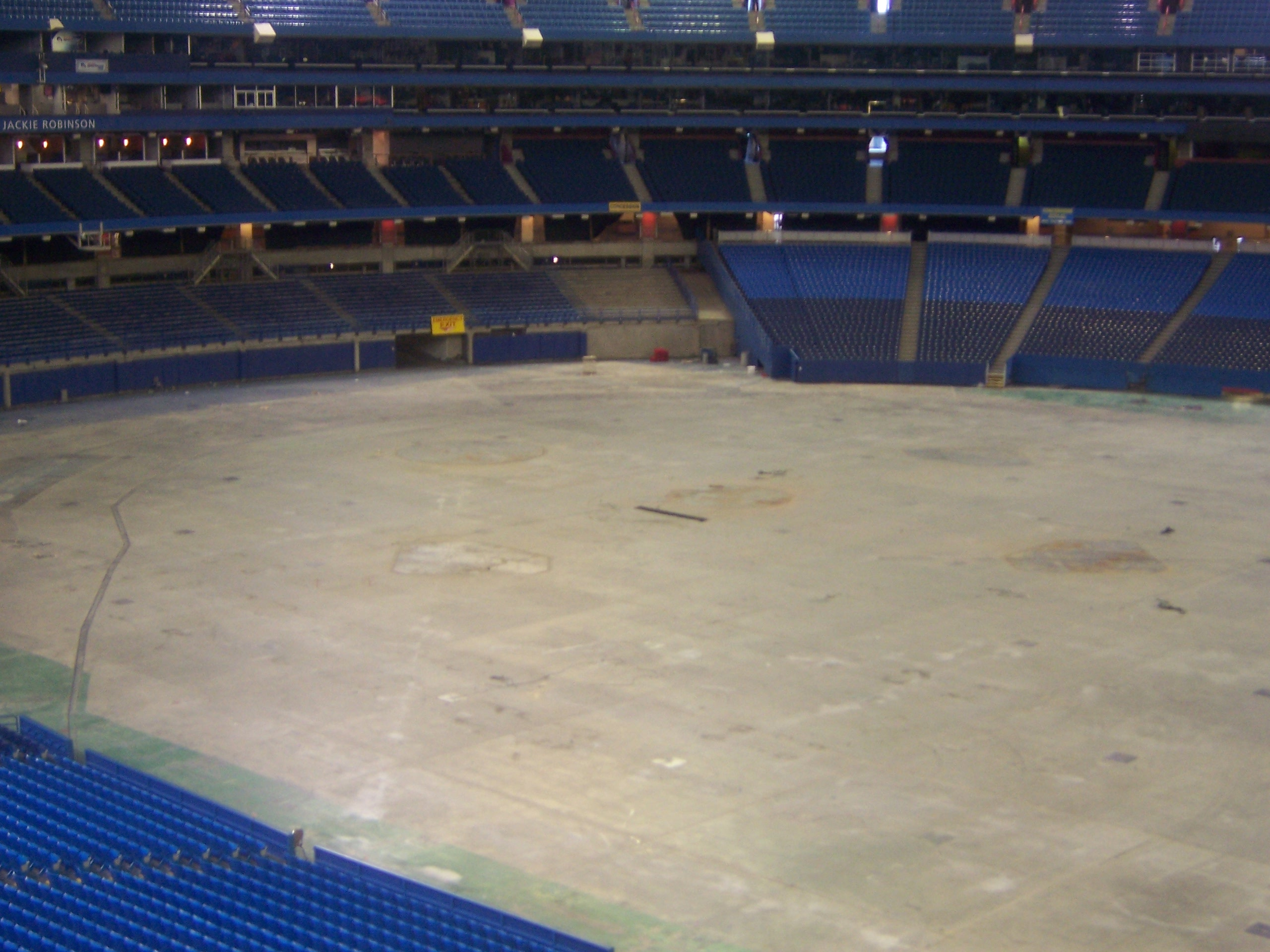
The stadium's field without its turf in 2006. The stadium's FieldTurf could be removed for events such as concerts and trade shows.

The venue was the first major team sports stadium in North America with a functional, fully retractable roof (Montreal's Olympic Stadium also had a retractable roof, but due to operational issues, it was replaced with a permanent fixed roof). The roof is composed of four panels and covers an area of 345,000 square feet (32,100 m^{2}). The two middle panels slide laterally to stack over the north semi-circular panel (which is fixed in place), and then the south semi-circular panel rotates around the stadium and nests inside the stack. It takes 20 minutes for the roof to open or close. It is not possible to move the roof in cold weather because the mechanism that closes the roof could fail in cooler weather.

=== Field ===
The original AstroTurf installation was replaced with FieldTurf from 2005 to 2010. The FieldTurf took about 40 hours to remove for events such as concerts or trade shows, as it used 1,400 trays that needed to be stacked and transported off the field. Prior to the 2010 baseball season, to reduce the amount of time required to convert the playing field, a new, roll-based version of AstroTurf was installed. Similar to FieldTurf, the installation uses a sand- and rubber-based infill within the synthetic fibres. Rogers Centre is one of five venues in Major League Baseball that use artificial turf (the others are Tropicana Field in St. Petersburg, Florida, LoanDepot Park in Miami, Globe Life Field in Arlington, Texas, and Chase Field in Phoenix, Arizona) and was the last venue to use "sliding pits" before switching to a full dirt infield for the 2016 baseball season. Before the Argonauts moved out, the pitcher's mound could be lowered or raised hydraulically when converting from baseball to football (or vice versa).

The use of natural grass was long thought to be unfeasible since the stadium was designed as a closed structure with a roof that opens, and as such, the interior was not intended or built to deal with weather, including low temperatures and drainage. As of the 2020 season, they are one of two teams to have never played a home game on grass at their main stadium (the Tampa Bay Rays played some home games in 2007 and 2008 at Champion Stadium in Walt Disney World in Bay Lake, Florida, as well as during the 2025 season at George M. Steinbrenner Field; during the 2020 and much of the 2021 seasons, due to travel restrictions amid the COVID-19 pandemic, the Toronto Blue Jays played most of their home games at their AAA affiliate's home stadium of Sahlen Field in Buffalo, New York with the Blue Jays also playing home games in TD Ballpark in Dunedin, Florida, during the first two months of the 2021 season). Along with Tropicana Field, the Rogers Centre warning track consists of brown turf, which does not provide any tactile differences from the rest of the field.

However, the Blue Jays have long explored the possibility of converting the Rogers Centre to a natural grass surface, and plans were examined in order to install a grass field by 2018 to allow enough time for research and growing of the sod. Installing grass would require digging up the floor, adding a drainage system, and installing 30 cm (1 ft) of dirt. The stadium would need to be permanently locked into its baseball configuration; the lower stands, which roll into position for football, would be permanently fixed in position for baseball. The plan became more definite when Rogers renewed the Argonauts' lease through 2017, but ruled out any further extensions; in May 2015, it was announced the Argonauts would move to BMO Field for the 2016 season. The Blue Jays subsequently confirmed the Argonauts' early departure would not accelerate their own plans to install grass in 2018, though it did allow for a dirt infield to be installed for the 2016 season. However, it does not appear likely the field will be converted to natural grass, as no further announcements for replacing the surface have been made since, and the field continues to retain its artificial surface.

=== Seating ===
There are a total of 5,700 club seats and 161 luxury suites at the Rogers Centre. The complex had a Hard Rock Café restaurant until December 2009 when the restaurant closed after its lease expired. The Toronto Marriott City Centre Hotel is also within Rogers Centre with 70 rooms, and a restaurant and bar called the Sportsnet Grill overlooks the field. The Blue Jays in partnership with theScore Bet announced plans in April 2022 to create a new premium branded flagship sports bar and restaurant that would be open 365 days a year at the Rogers Centre and provide sports betting lines, including for daily fantasy sports.

==== Seating capacity ====
Baseball
| Years | Capacity |
|---|---|
| 1989–1998 | 50,516 |
| 1999–2002 | 45,100 |
| 2003–2004 | 50,516 |
| 2005–2006 | 50,598 |
| 2007 | 48,900 |
| 2008–2010 | 49,539 |
| 2011–2012 | 49,260 |
| 2013–2022 | 49,282 |
| 2023 | 41,500 |
| 2024–present | 39,150 |

Football
Capacity
53,506

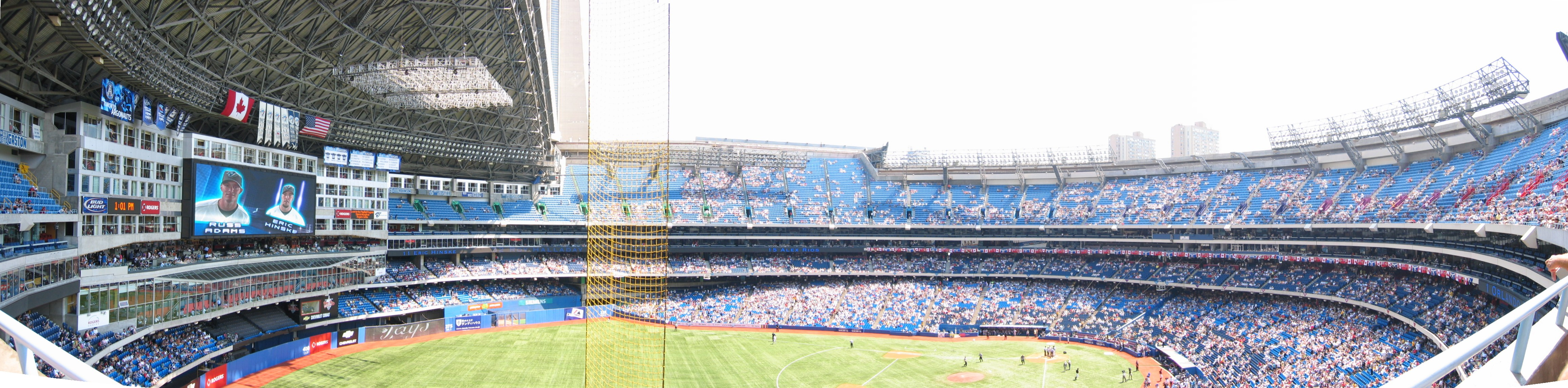
Panorama of the interior seating and field for Rogers Centre in 2006

=== Main video board ===
The Rogers Centre video board is 33 feet (10 m) high and 110 feet (34 m) across. The panel is made up of modular LED units that can be replaced unit by unit, and can be repaired immediately should it be damaged during an event. Originally, this screen was a Sony Jumbotron, which was the largest in North America at the time of the stadium's opening, but it has since been replaced a few times. There are also two ribbon boards made up of LEDs that run along the east and west sides of the stadium interior. Each board is 434 feet (132 m) long by 3.5 feet (1.1 m) high. In addition, two video boards make up parts of the left and right outfield walls while the stadium is in baseball configuration. These are 65 feet (20 m) wide by nearly 10 feet (3.0 m) high.

The main video board was upgraded again for the 2022 Blue Jays season, this time by using more modern technology and adding four "wings", two on each side of the central part of the main video board with the lower wings on each side being wider, making the main video board no longer rectangular. This was to accommodate the windows of the hotel behind the main video board.

The video board and the stadium played host to several serial television events, including the series finales for Cheers and Star Trek: The Next Generation, along with live coverage of the funeral of Princess Diana in 1997.

The Rogers Centre was used to host watch parties during the 1992, 1993, and 2025 World Series when the Blue Jays were on the road against the Atlanta Braves, the Philadelphia Phillies, and the Los Angeles Dodgers, respectively.

=== Public art ===
Over $5 million of artwork was commissioned in 1989 ($11 million in 2025 dollars):

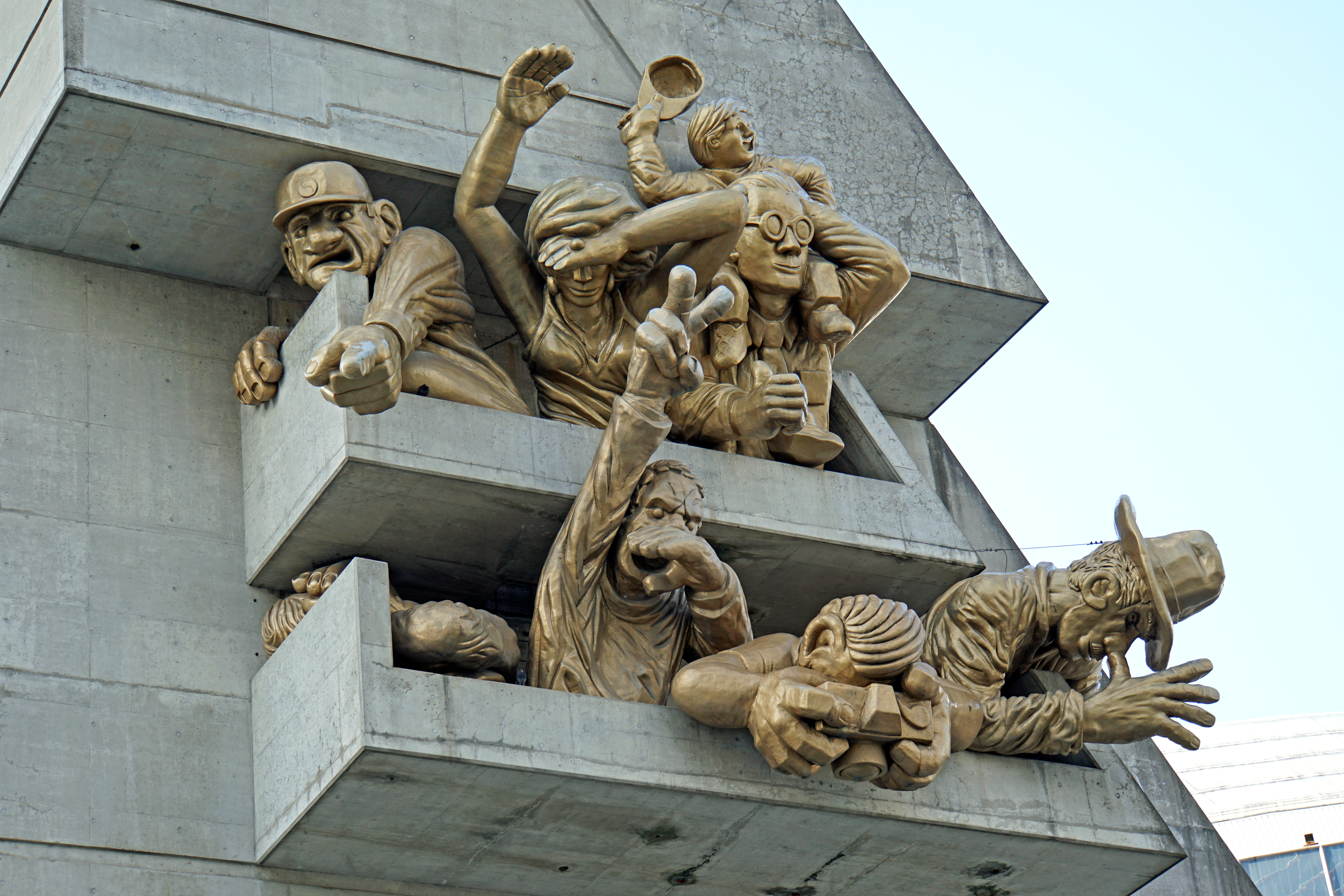
The Audience is a depiction of larger-than-life fans by Michael Snow above the northeast (shown) and northwest entrances of Rogers Centre.

- The Audience – by Michael Snow, above the northeast and northwest entrances; it is a larger-than-life depiction of fans in various acts of celebration.
- A Tribute to Baseball – by Lutz Haufschild, above the southeast and southwest entrances of Gate 5.
- The Art of the Possible – by Mimi Gellman, inside along the north side of the concourse on the 100 Level. The glass and steel sculpture incorporates the signatures of 2,000 builders of SkyDome, and is a tribute to their work. Some of the artifacts found during excavation, such as musket balls and pottery, have also been included. The brightly illuminated sculpture became an issue to baseball players when the stadium first opened. The bright lights were considered a distraction to batters.
- Salmon Run – by Susan Schelle, outside by the southeast entrance in Bobbie Rosenfeld Park; it is a large fountain with various stainless steel salmon cutouts.
- Spiral Fountain – by Judith Schwarz.

A statue of Edward S. Rogers Jr., founder of Rogers Communications, which purchased the Rogers Centre and Toronto Blue Jays in the early 2000s, was installed outside Rogers Centre between Gates 5 and 6, in 2013. In February 2026 it was announced that the statue would be moved to Rogers corporate headquarters, and replaced by a statue of Joe Carter's 1993 World Series home run. The new statue was unveiled on 18 July 2026.

=== Parking ===
Rogers Centre's parking lot is located under the stadium itself. The underground parking lot is divided into four sections for stadium use (Sun, Moon, Star, and Cloud) and the ramps within the stadium correspond to these sections, while the fifth section, the Hotel Zone, being the northernmost section, is reserved for hotel uses by the Toronto Marriott City Centre Hotel directly above this section.

== Stadium usage ==
=== Baseball ===
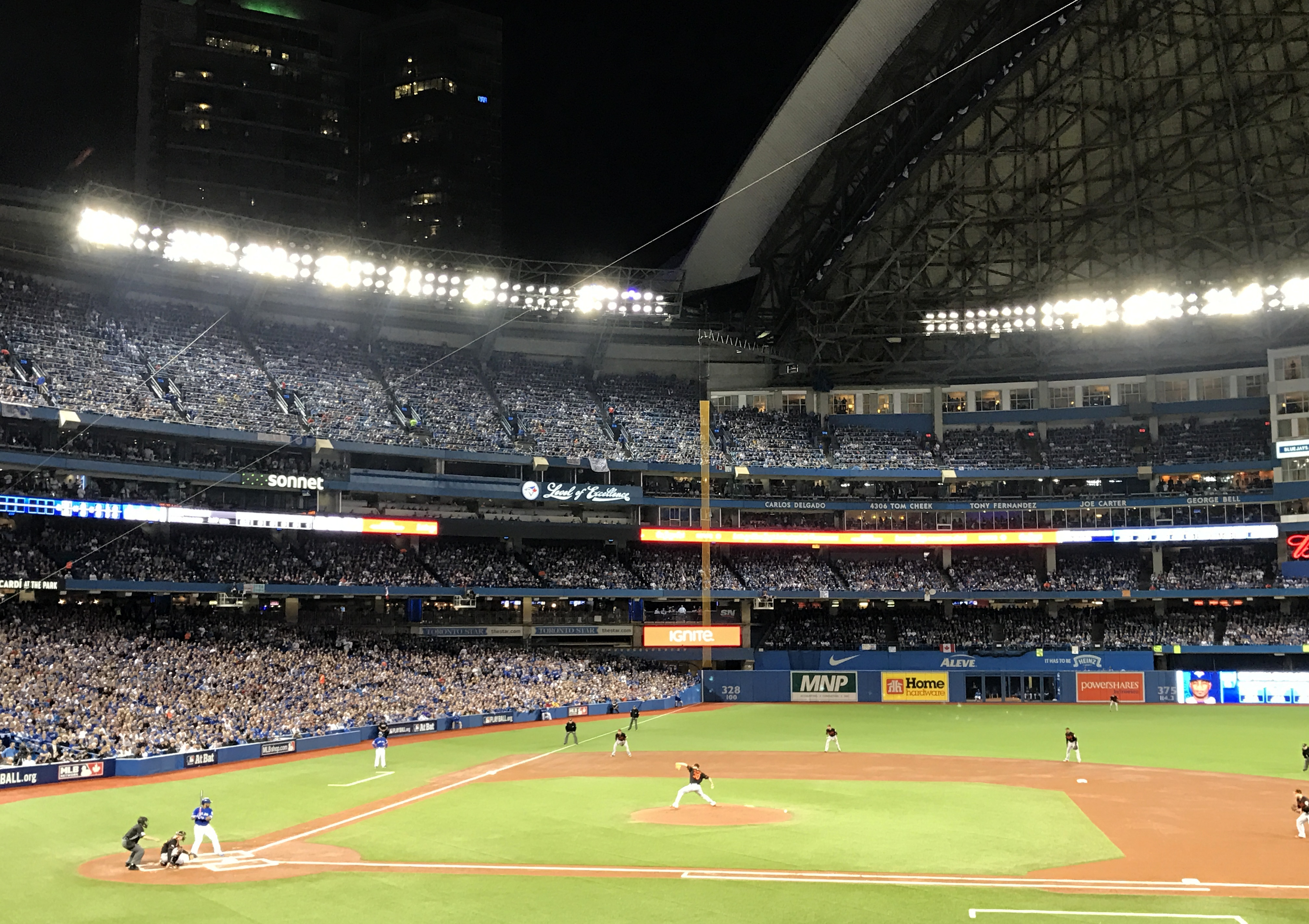
The 2016 American League Wild Card Game held at the Rogers Centre

The Blue Jays have hosted three World Series at Rogers Centre. Games 3, 4, and 5 of the 1992 World Series and Games 1, 2, and 6 of the 1993 World Series were played at the stadium, then known as SkyDome, with the Jays winning the championship both years. Games 1, 2, 6 and 7 of the 2025 World Series were also hosted at Rogers Centre. Additionally, the stadium hosted the 1991 Major League Baseball All-Star Game.

Game 3 of the 1992 World Series was the first time a championship game was ever played outside of the United States. The 1991 American League Championship Series was the first Major League Baseball playoff series played entirely indoors, with the first two games at the Metrodome in Minneapolis and the final three at SkyDome.

Games in the first round of the 2009 World Baseball Classic were played at the Rogers Centre.

=== Basketball ===
Besides baseball, Rogers Centre was the original home of the National Basketball Association's Toronto Raptors, who played at the venue from November 1995 to February 1999, while the Air Canada Centre (later renamed Scotiabank Arena) was being planned and built. It proved to be somewhat problematic as a basketball venue, even considering it was only a temporary facility. For instance, many seats theoretically in line with the court were so far away that fans needed binoculars to see the action. Other seats were so badly obstructed that fans sitting there could only watch the game on the replay boards. For most games, Rogers Centre seated 22,900 people. However, the Raptors sometimes opened the 500 Level, which is the stadium's uppermost level, when popular opponents came to town, such as the Chicago Bulls when Michael Jordan was a member of the team, expanding capacity to 29,000 and held over 36,000 attendees at one point.

=== Football ===
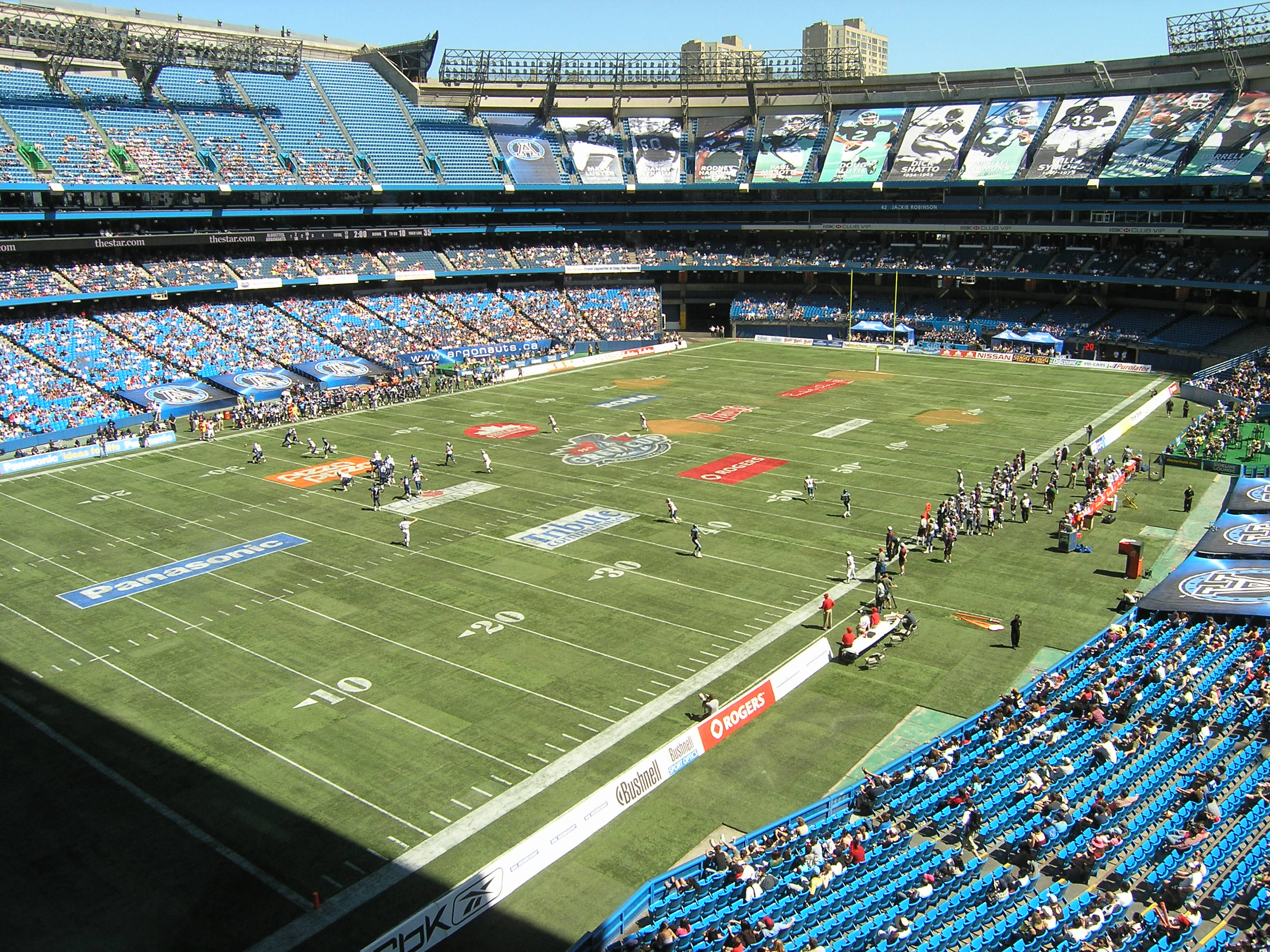
The Rogers Centre's field arranged for Canadian football with some seats in the 500 Level closed off and replaced with large banners

Rogers Centre hosted Canadian football from opening in 1989 to 2015, as the Argonauts moved to BMO Field in 2016. In November 2007, it hosted the 95th Grey Cup, its first since 1992 and third all-time. It was the 56th Grey Cup hosted by the city of Toronto since the championship's inception in 1909.

From 1989 to 2003, SkyDome hosted the Vanier Cup championship of Canadian Interuniversity Sport (later renamed U Sports in 2016) football.

In 1994, then-part owner of SkyDome Labatt considered purchasing a National Football League and a Major League Soccer team to play at the stadium.

The International Bowl, an NCAA college football game between two American schools – one from the Big East Conference and one from the Mid-American Conference – has been played at Rogers Centre four times. The Big East school has won all four bowl games. On January 6, 2007, the University of Cincinnati Bearcats defeated the Western Michigan University Broncos, 27–24. The Scarlet Knights of Rutgers University won the second bowl game in the series on January 5, 2008, by beating the Cardinals of Ball State University, 52–30. The Bulls of the University at Buffalo, a school within a ninety-minute drive of Rogers Centre, lost the third International Bowl to the University of Connecticut Huskies, 38–20. On January 2, 2010, the University of South Florida Bulls beat the Huskies of Northern Illinois University, 27–3.

Rogers Centre was also the venue for the 43rd Vanier Cup on Friday, November 23, 2007, just two days before Grey Cup Sunday. It was the 16th Vanier Cup hosted at the venue, returning after a three-year absence in which it was hosted by Hamilton, Ontario (2004 and 2005) and Saskatoon, Saskatchewan (2006). It was the 40th Vanier Cup hosted by Toronto since that championship's inception in 1965.

==== NFL ====
The National Football League's Buffalo Bills announced its intentions to play five "home" games (and three pre-season games) in Rogers Centre in October 2007, so beginning the Bills Toronto Series; the first of these regular-season games took place on December 7 of the 2008 season versus the Miami Dolphins. It marked the first time an NFL team has established a "home" stadium outside the United States for regular-season games. The Bills played a preseason game against the Pittsburgh Steelers at Rogers Centre on August 14, 2008; the Toronto Series was played every year through the 2013 season.

=== Soccer ===
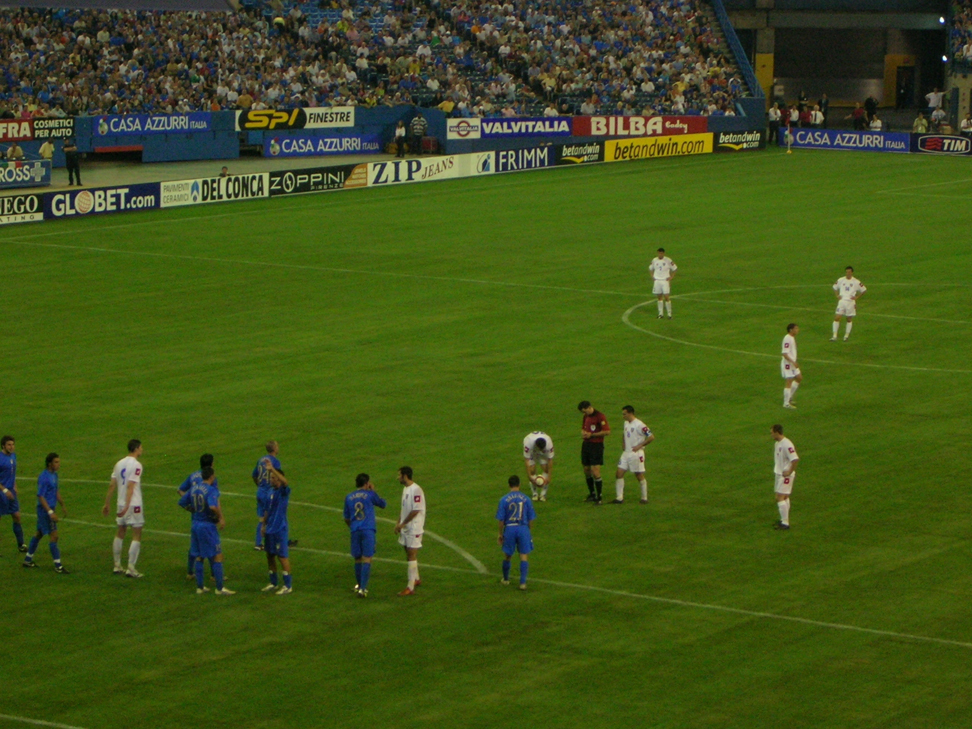
A soccer match between Serbia and Italy in 2005

The SkyDome Cup was held in late January 1995 between hosts Canada, then–European champions Denmark (specifically Denmark League XI), and Portugal. From the mid-2000s, soccer matches have been regularly held in SkyDome / Rogers Centre; they had been rarely played at the venue when its AstroTurf surface had been in place. Examples of soccer (association football) matches:

- On June 8, 2005, an international soccer friendly between Serbia and Montenegro and Italy took place, ending in a 1–1 draw.
- On May 25, 2010, the stadium hosted a friendly soccer match between Italy's ACF Fiorentina and Juventus FC with Fiorentina winning 1–0.
- On July 16, 2010, the stadium hosted a friendly soccer match between England's Manchester United F.C. and Scotland's Celtic F.C. Manchester United F.C. defeated Celtic F.C. with a score of 3–1. The match was played on a temporary grass surface harvested from Burford, Ontario and transported via 18 tractor-trailers.
- On July 21, 2012, the stadium hosted the friendly between Toronto FC and Liverpool F.C., a match that finished in a 1–1 draw.
- On November 19, 2013, Rogers Centre hosted a friendly soccer match between Brazil and Chile, a match that finished in a 2–1 victory for the Brazilian side.

| Date | Winning Team | Result | Losing Team | Competition | Spectators |
|---|---|---|---|---|---|
| January 24, 1995 | Denmark League XI | 1–0 | Canada | SkyDome Cup | 10,024 |
| January 26, 1995 | Canada | 1–1 | Portugal | SkyDome Cup | 13,658 |
| January 29, 1995 | Portugal | 1–0 | Denmark League XI | SkyDome Cup | 23,723 |
| July 30, 2004 | (Portugal) FC Porto | 1–0 | (England) Liverpool | Club Friendly | 40,078 |
| July 31, 2004 | (Italy) Roma | 1–0 | (Scotland) Celtic | Club Friendly | 50,168 |
| June 8, 2005 | Serbia and Montenegro | 1–1 | Italy | International Friendly | 22,138 |
| July 12, 2005 | (Croatia) Dinamo Zagreb | 1–0 | (Scotland) Rangers | Club Friendly | 18,159 |
| July 7, 2006 | United States | 2–1 | Canada | International U20 Friendly | 5,325 |
| May 25, 2010 | (Italy) ACF Fiorentina | 1–0 | (Italy) Juventus | Club Friendly | 21,122 |
| July 16, 2010 | (England) Manchester United | 3–1 | (Scotland) Celtic | Club Friendly | 39,193 |
| August 3, 2010 | (Greece) Panathinaikos | 3–2 | (Italy) Inter Milan | Club Friendly | 17,169 |
| March 7, 2012 | (Canada) Toronto FC | 2–2 | (United States) Los Angeles Galaxy | CONCACAF Champions League quarterfinals | 47,658 |
| July 21, 2012 | (Canada) Toronto FC | 1–1 | (England) Liverpool | Club Friendly | 33,087 |
| March 9, 2013 | (Canada) Toronto FC | 2–1 | (United States) Sporting Kansas City | MLS Regular Season | 25,991 |
| November 19, 2013 | Brazil | 2–1 | Chile | International Friendly | 38,154 |

=== Motorsports ===
Having originated in 1980 at Exhibition Stadium, the Toronto Supercross moved to the Rogers Centre upon its opening in 1989. The event was held annually through 1996 before going on hiatus. It was revived as a part of the FIM World Supercross GP series in 2004 and joined the AMA Supercross Championship after the two series fully merged in 2008. The event ran until 2014 and returned for 2016 and 2017. Then, on January 16, 1993, the stadium hosted the Skydome Grand Prix featuring the USAC National Midget Car Series. The night of racing featured NASCAR stars John Andretti, Kenny Irwin Jr., Tony Stewart and Indianapolis 500 winner Tom Sneva racing on a 1/6 mile oval track and was broadcast across Canada on TSN.

=== Other sports ===
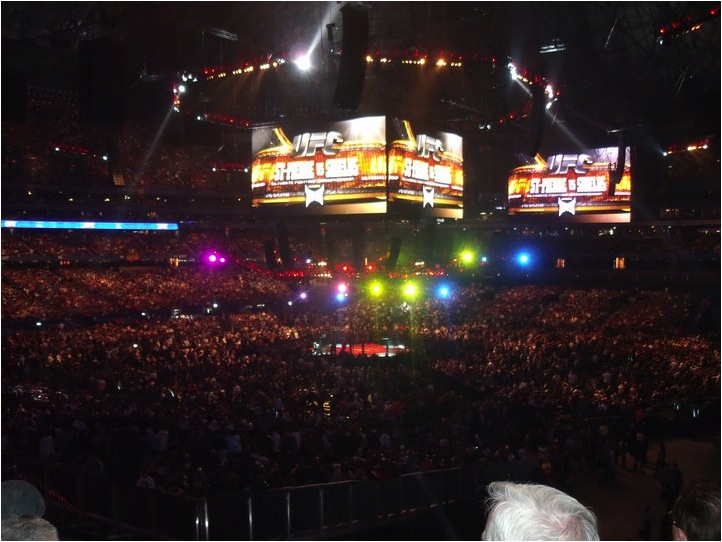
UFC 129 was held at the Rogers Centre in April 2011.

Rogers Centre has also hosted exhibition cricket, gaelic football, hurling, Australian rules football and tennis.

It hosted the 1993 IAAF World Indoor Track and Field Championships.

On May 31, 1997, the venue hosted a post-Olympic track and field event that pitted Olympic track champions Donovan Bailey and Michael Johnson, in a 150 m race billed as a competition for the title of the "World's Fastest Man", given media disputes over that title during the 1996 Summer Olympics in Atlanta. Bailey won the race, completing it in a time of 15 seconds and winning the $1.5 million prize. Johnson pulled up lame at the 110 m mark claiming a quadriceps injury.

Rogers Centre is the site of several major high school and collegiate sporting competitions, such as the Prentice Cup for high school baseball. Since 2008, the Rogers Centre is the host of the Greater Toronto high schools' Metro Bowl for Canadian football. On April 30, 2011, UFC 129 was hosted at Rogers Centre, in the first major mixed martial arts event to ever be held in Ontario after the province lifted a ban on prizefighting. Due to overwhelming demand for tickets (with the initial slate of 42,000 selling in around half an hour), the UFC and Rogers Centre reconfigured the event for 55,000 tickets. The event broke a UFC attendance record set at UFC 124 in Montreal, and also set records for the largest single-day gate revenue in both UFC (surpassing UFC 66 by at least double) and Rogers Centre history.

For the 2015 Pan American Games, the Rogers Centre was used for the opening and closing ceremonies.

=== Professional wrestling ===
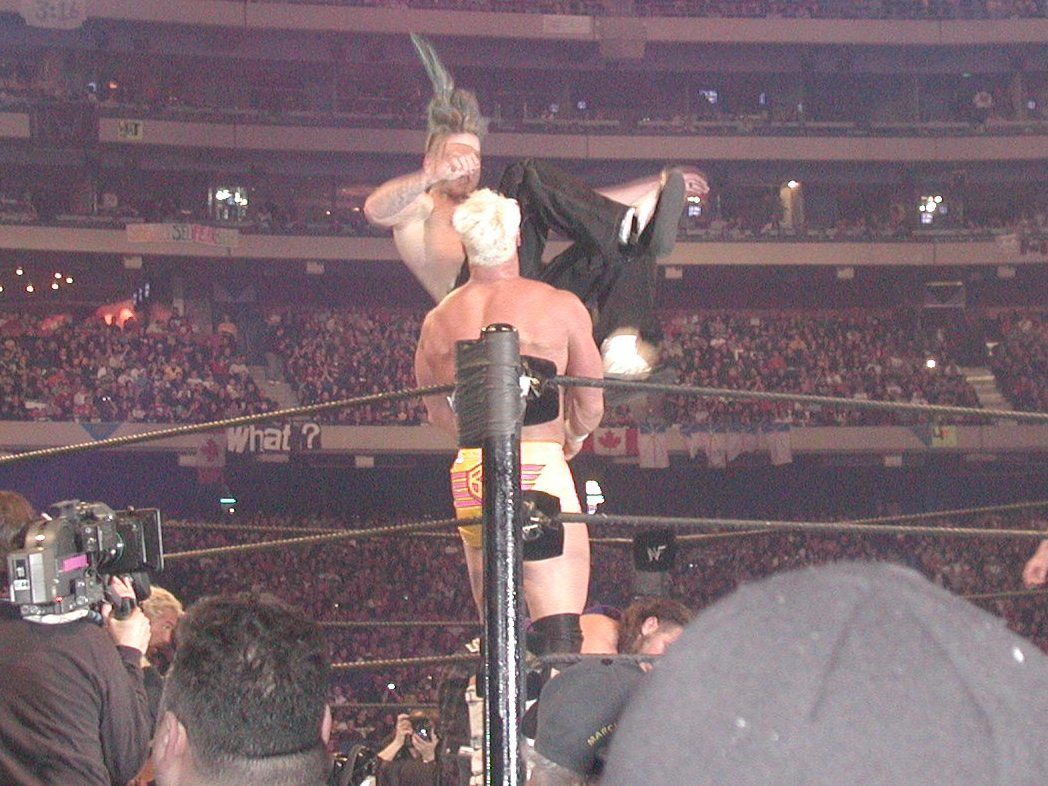
WrestleMania X8 at the stadium in 2002

WWE has hosted WrestleMania at Rogers Centre twice. Under the former name of WWF, WrestleMania VI was held on April 1, 1990, with the main event being a title vs title match which saw WWF Intercontinental Champion The Ultimate Warrior defeat the World Heavyweight Champion Hulk Hogan, set the SkyDome attendance record of 67,678. The attendance record was broken when 68,237 attended WrestleMania X8 on March 17, 2002, the main event seeing Triple H win the Undisputed WWF Championship from Canadian Chris Jericho.

In February 1999, the stadium hosted a taping for the February 13, 1999, episode of Raw (a special Saturday-night airing due to USA Network's coverage of the Westminster Kennel Club Dog Show), featuring Stone Cold Steve Austin being defeated by Mr. McMahon in a gauntlet match against The Corporation. It had the largest crowd in Raw history, with a reported attendance of 41,432.

On March 1, 2025, WWE returned to the Rogers Centre to host Elimination Chamber.

=== Music concerts ===
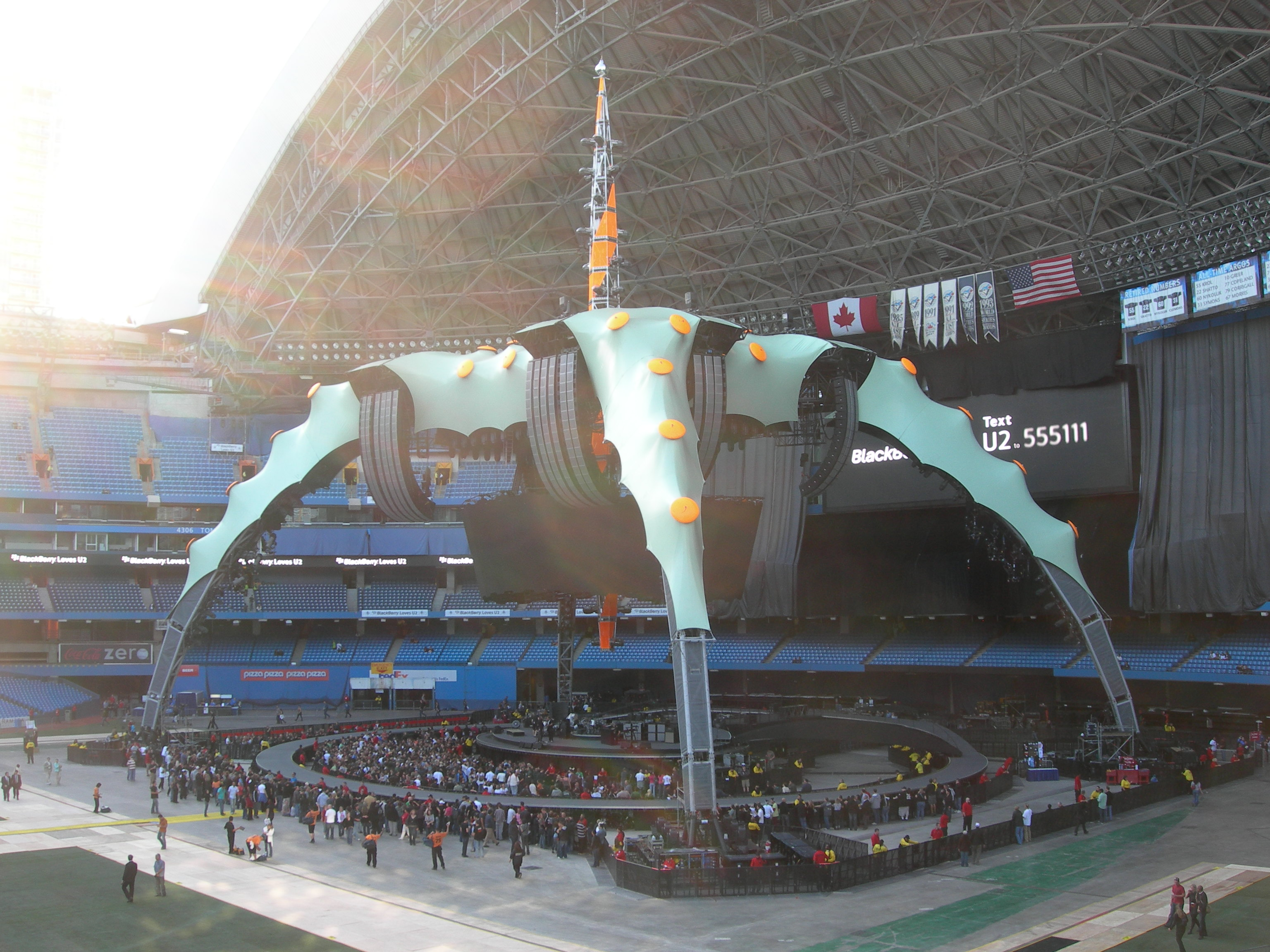
Preparations taking place at the Rogers Centre before a U2 concert

The stadium has several concert configurations, including smaller Theatre (capacity 5,000 to 7,000) and Concert Hall (formerly SkyTent; capacity 10,000 to 25,000). Due to the stadium's design and building materials, the acoustics are poor, and the loudness/quality can vary greatly around the stadium. Its popularity with artists and fans has diminished over the years, and the Scotiabank Arena and Rogers Stadium now host most major concerts. The SkyTent, a group of acoustical curtain sails hoisted on rigging above the floor, helps reduce sound distortion and improve sound quality by dampening reverberations around the stadium.

Soon after its opening, the stadium became a popular venue for large-scale rock concerts and is the largest indoor concert venue in Toronto. Artists have included:

- U2 with two concerts in 2009, as well as their concert in 2011, all part of their 360° Tour.
- Bon Jovi performed two sellout shows on July 20 and 21, 2010, at Rogers Centre as part of The Circle Tour.
- Bruce Springsteen performed on August 24, 2012, during his Wrecking Ball World Tour in front of 39,000 attendees.
- The Rolling Stones played two sold-out concerts at the stadium: on December 4, 1989, during the Steel Wheels Tour and on September 26, 2005, during their highest-grossing tour A Bigger Bang Tour.
- Madonna performed three shows from 27 May 1990 at the Skydome, the shows were part of the Blond Ambition World Tour, and were Canada's only dates. (Note: One of the more notable concerts, as shown in the documentary Truth or Dare. The touring show had become extremely controversial due to the risqué visuals and performances. When the concert arrived in Toronto, police were alerted that the show might violate local obscenity laws. The police were on site for the concert and threatened charges without changes. The show went on as planned, however, without any legal action taken.) Later, she performed two concerts at the stadium again during The Girlie Show World Tour for October 11 & 12, 1993.
- Rogers Centre has been a venue for large electronic dance music events. During 2013, the stadium hosted two electronic dance music events, including two sold-out shows on Swedish House Mafia's One Last Tour, and Sensation.
- Guns N' Roses performed at Rogers Centre on July 16, 2016, during their Not in This Lifetime... Tour in front of 48,016 attendees with Billy Talent.
- Metallica also played a sold-out show at the stadium as part of their WorldWired Tour on July 16, 2017, with special guests Avenged Sevenfold and Volbeat.
- Shawn Mendes headlined his first stadium show to a sold-out crowd on September 6, 2019, at Rogers Centre during his Shawn Mendes: The Tour.
- Beyoncé opened the North American leg of her Renaissance World Tour at the Rogers Center on July 8 and 9 2023, for 56,577 people.
- Taylor Swift, the American singer-songwriter performed at the Rogers Centre as part of The Eras Tour from November 14 to 16, 2024 and subsequently November 21 to 23rd, which made her the first artist to schedule six shows on a single tour at Rogers Centre.
- Kendrick Lamar and SZA, the American rapper and singer-songwriter performed two sold-out shows back to back on June 12 and 13, 2025 during their Grand National World Tour.
- Abel Tesfaye aka The Weeknd, the Toronto native singer-songwriter, performed at the Rogers Centre as part of the After Hours til Dawn Tour on September 22–23, 2022; July 27–28, and August 7–8, 2025, and was awarded the keys to the city of Toronto for his July 27–28, 2025 performances, officially recognized as "The Weeknd Weekend."

=== Other uses ===
- Rogers Centre contains 143,000 sq ft (13,300 m^{2}) of exhibition space, allowing it to host a variety of events year-round.
- Disney on Ice and circuses have used the venue.
- It is home to several annual auto shows, with the Canadian International AutoShow in February and Importfest in October.
- The opening ceremonies of the XVI International AIDS Conference were held at Rogers Centre on August 13, 2006.
- It has also hosted many public speakers, including appearances by the Dalai Lama, Christian evangelist Billy Graham, Nelson Mandela, and for a book reading with J. K. Rowling and Margaret Atwood.
- In addition to being a venue that hosts sports, concerts and other events, the Rogers Centre also houses the head offices of a number of businesses. The Toronto Blue Jays have its office headquarters in the building and until 2008, the Toronto Argonauts did as well. It is also the home of the head offices of Ticketmaster Canada and Zuffa Canada, the former also having the main Ticketmaster outlet (ticket centre) for eastern Canada, at the south end of the building beside Gate 9.
- In addition, the building contains the Toronto Renaissance Hotel, a Premier Fitness/Health Club, (formerly) a Hard Rock Cafe (now John Street Terrace), and (formerly) Windows Restaurant (now WestJet Flight Deck). From 2006 until its closure in 2009, the Hard Rock Cafe only opened when there was a performance in the building. On non-event days, there are daily tours of the Rogers Centre.

=== Attendance records ===
- World Wrestling Federation's WrestleMania X8 attracted the largest paid crowd to SkyDome. The March 17, 2002, event gathered 68,237 fans. WrestleMania VI held the previous record of 67,678 on April 1, 1990.
- Major League Baseball: The 1991 All-Star Game on July 9 attracted 52,383 spectators.
- Billy Graham Mission Ontario Youth Rally: This meeting, on June 10, 1995, is conceivably the most attended event in the stadium's history. The attendance of 72,500 was boosted by performances by several Christian music groups, and by extensive seating on the field. There were as many as 30,000 people outside, watching the event on screens around the stadium.
- Toronto Blue Jays: A crowd of 52,268 attended game five of the 1992 World Series, which Toronto lost 7–2 to the Atlanta Braves. The smallest crowd for a Jays game occurred in April 2010, when 10,314 watched Toronto win 8–1 against the Kansas City Royals.
- Canadian Football League: 54,088 packed the SkyDome to watch the 1989 Grey Cup Game between the Saskatchewan Roughriders and the Hamilton Tiger-Cats.
- Toronto Argonauts: The 1991 Eastern Division Final played against the Winnipeg Blue Bombers drew a crowd of 50,386. The smallest crowd for an Argonauts game occurred on July 13, 2001, when 11,041 people watched Toronto lose 30–16 against Winnipeg
- National Football League: 55,799 fans filled the Rogers Centre to see the Buffalo Bills defeat the Dallas Cowboys 9–7 in an American Bowl exhibition game on August 12, 1995.
- Toronto Raptors: A March 24, 1996, game against the Chicago Bulls drew a crowd of 36,131. For this game, the basketball venue was reconfigured to accommodate more fans due to the popularity of the visiting team, which basketball superstar Michael Jordan played for during this time. The expansion Raptors handed the record-setting Bulls one of their ten defeats that season, winning 109–108.
- Soccer: A July 31, 2004, soccer game between Celtic F.C. and AS Roma drew 50,158.
- Mixed martial arts: UFC 129 sold 55,000 tickets for the highest single-day event gate in the stadium's history and set new world records for the sport.

== Timeline ==
- 1986 – October 3 – SkyDome's ground is broken.
- 1987 – June 3 – The stadium is officially named "SkyDome".
- 1989 – June 2 – Dress rehearsal for opening ceremony, family/friends of volunteer performers invited to attend. First unofficial "wave" performed at SkyDome.
- 1989 – June 3 – SkyDome officially opens, hosting a live opening night gala.
- 1989 – June 5 – SkyDome plays host to its first Blue Jays game. The Blue Jays lose 5–3 to the Milwaukee Brewers.
- 1989 – June 5 – Fred McGriff hits the first home run at SkyDome.
- 1989 – June 7 – John Cerutti records the first Blue Jays win at SkyDome, beating the Brewers 4–2.
- 1989 – June 8 – Rod Stewart performs the first concert at SkyDome.
- 1989 – July 12 – The stadium plays host to its first Argonauts game, a 24–15 loss to the Hamilton Tiger-Cats.
- 1989 – July 17 – First Doubleheader at Skydome and the Jays win both games beating the Angels.
- 1989 – October 7 - Athletics' Jose Canseco hits a home run into the fifth deck of SkyDome, off Toronto Blue Jays' pitcher Mike Flanagan. It is an estimated 480-foot (150 m) shot, although one journalist estimated it to be at least 500 feet.
- 1989 – November 5 – Rest of the World defeats West Indies by 11 runs in longest game (cricket) hosted by SkyDome
- 1989 – November 26 – The Saskatchewan Roughriders defeat the Hamilton Tiger-Cats 43–40 in the 77th Grey Cup.
- 1990 – April 1 – WrestleMania VI saw the then SkyDome attendance record of 67,678.
- 1990 – The MLB single-season attendance record is broken with 58 sellouts and a season total crowd of 3,885,284.
- 1991 – July 9 – The stadium is the host of the MLB All-Star Game.
- 1992 – The Calgary Stampeders defeat the Winnipeg Blue Bombers 24–10 in the 80th Grey Cup.
- 1992 – The first World Series game outside the United States is played at SkyDome, as the Blue Jays host the Atlanta Braves in game three of the 1992 World Series.
- 1993 – October 23 – The Blue Jays win their second straight World Series championship when Toronto outfielder Joe Carter hits a walk-off home run against Philadelphia Phillies pitcher Mitch Williams.
- 1995 – June 22 – During a game against the Milwaukee Brewers, two acoustic panels fall off the inner ceiling in the seventh inning, injuring seven fans. The game is not stopped.
- 1995 – July 9 – A worker dies when installing lights for a computer show (falling 7.6 metres (25 ft))
- 1998 – November – Several dignitaries, including Prime Minister of Canada Jean Chrétien, honour the visiting South African president Nelson Mandela.
- 1998 – November – SkyDome files for bankruptcy protection.
- 1998 – SkyDome is purchased out of bankruptcy by Sportsco.
- 2001 – April 12 – A scheduled Blue Jays' game against the Kansas City Royals is cancelled due to the retractable roof jamming during a test run, damaging the roof and sending debris crashing to the field below.
- 2001 – August 3 – The retractable roof is ordered closed in the third inning of a Toronto Blue Jays' game against the Baltimore Orioles at the request of home plate umpire Tim Welke, as a swarm of thousands of aphids descends on SkyDome.
- 2001 – Oct 5 – The second doubleheader at SkyDome and the Jays win both games again beating the Cleveland Indians.
- 2002 – March 17 – WrestleMania X8 sets the SkyDome attendance record of 68,237.
- 2005 – February 2 – Rogers Communications buys the stadium and renames it Rogers Centre.
- 2007 – November 25 – Rogers Centre plays host to the 95th Grey Cup, the first in Toronto in 15 years. The Saskatchewan Roughriders defeat the Winnipeg Blue Bombers 23–19 in the game.
- 2008 – August 14 – Rogers Centre plays host to a pre-season National Football League game between the Buffalo Bills and Pittsburgh Steelers, the first of a five-year lease deal that sees the Bills playing occasional home games in Toronto.
- 2011 – April 30 – Rogers Centre holds its first UFC event, UFC 129. It is the first to be held in a stadium and was the biggest MMA event in North America at that time.
- 2011 – June 25 – Rogers Centre successfully holds the first International Indian Film Academy Awards event in North America.
- 2012 – November 25 – The Toronto Argonauts defeat the Calgary Stampeders in the 100th Grey Cup 35–22. Johnny Reid headlined a special Kick-Off Show, and half time performers include internationally renowned Canadian singers Justin Bieber, Carly Rae Jepsen, Marianas Trench, and Gordon Lightfoot.
- 2015 – July 10 – Rogers Centre holds the opening ceremony of the 2015 Pan American Games.

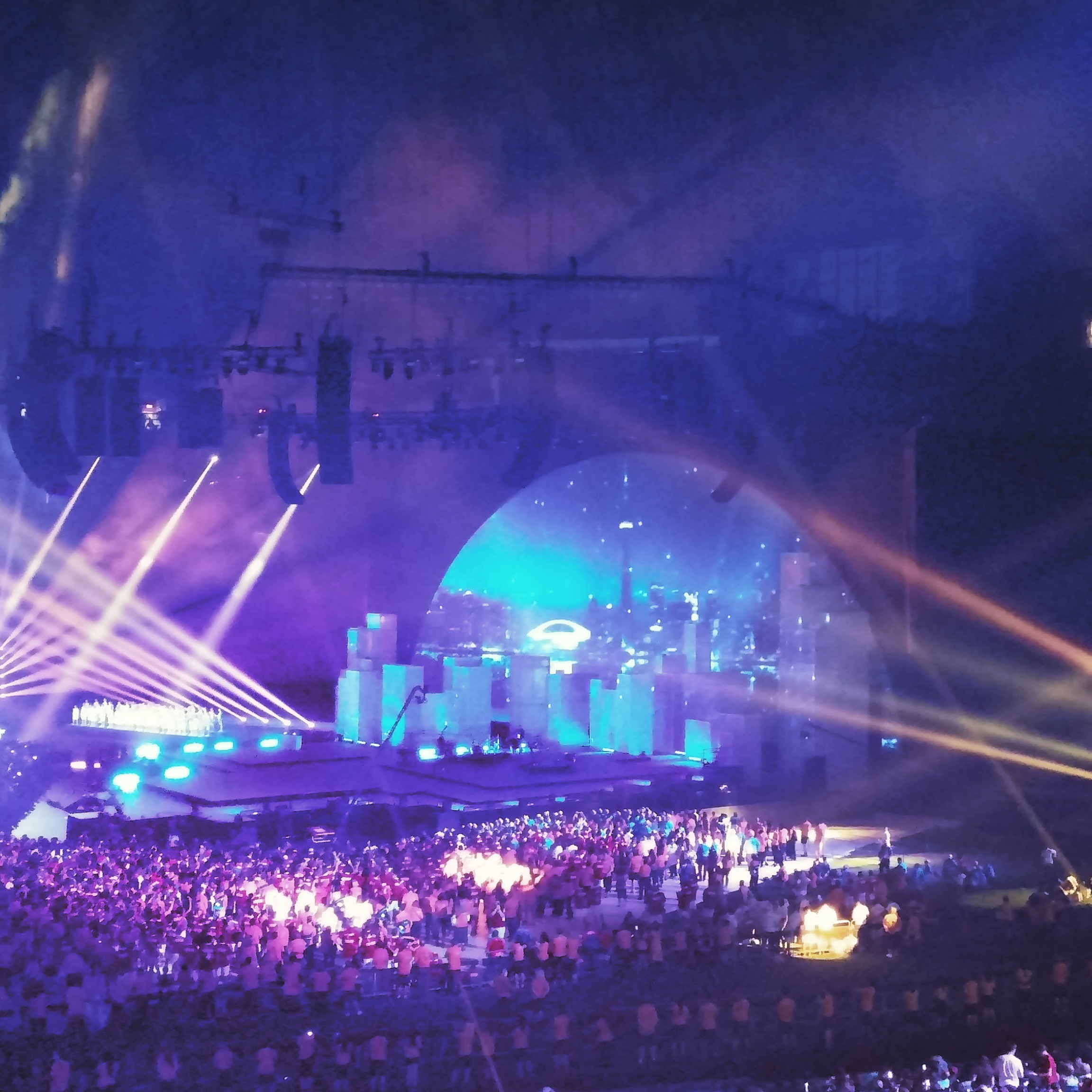
Scene from the 2015 Pan American Games closing ceremony, held at the Rogers Centre

- 2015 – July 26 – Rogers Centre holds the closing ceremony of the 2015 Pan American Games.
- 2015 - November 6 - The last Argonauts game hosted at Rogers Centre before the team's move to BMO Field in the next season. The Argonauts won against the Winnipeg Blue Bombers with a score of 21–11.
- 2016 – October 4 – Rogers Centre opens its roof for the first time in Blue Jays postseason history during the American League Wild Card Game against the Baltimore Orioles.
- 2018 – April 16 – A scheduled Blue Jays' game against the Kansas City Royals is cancelled due to the retractable roof having a hole as a result of the mid-April 2018 ice storm.
- 2018 – April 17 – The third doubleheader in Blue Jays history at Rogers Centre and the Blue Jays would remain unbeaten in doubleheaders at Rogers Centre as they beat Royals 11–3 in Game 1 and 5–4 in Game 2.
- 2020–21 – The Blue Jays are forced to relocate their home games to Sahlen Field in Buffalo, New York and TD Ballpark in Dunedin, Florida on a temporary basis for the 2020 season and the start of the following season as a result of the COVID-19 pandemic and the closure of the Canada–United States border.
- 2021 – July 30 – The first Blue Jays game back at Rogers Centre since the beginning of the COVID-19 pandemic was against the Kansas City Royals.
- 2022 – July - The Blue Jays unveil plans for a major renovation of the Rogers Centre, with phase 1 focusing on outfield improvements.
- 2023 – July - Phase 2 of the Rogers Centre renovation plans are unveiled.
- 2024 – April - The two offseason renovations are completed, and the stadium was officially re-opened.
- 2025 – March 1 - WWE hosted Elimination Chamber: Toronto, which had an attendance of 38,493. The event was also notable for the John Cena turning heel for the first time in 22 years, and was the highest-grossing WWE event ever held in Canada.

== Facts and figures ==
=== Baseball firsts ===
==== Opening day (June 5, 1989) ====
Reference: Retrosheet: Skydome firsts

| Statistic | Details |
| Score | Milwaukee Brewers 5, Toronto Blue Jays 3 |
| Umpires | Rocky Roe (home); Mike Reilly (first base); Rich Garcia (second base); Dale Scott (third base) |
| Managers | Cito Gaston (Blue Jays); Tom Trebelhorn (Brewers) |
| Starting pitchers | Jimmy Key (Blue Jays); Don August (Brewers) |
| Attendance | 48,378 |

==== Batting ====
| Statistic | Details |
| Batter | Paul Molitor, Brewers |
| Blue Jays Batter | Junior Félix |
| Hit | Paul Molitor, Brewers (double) |
| Run | Paul Molitor, Brewers |
| Blue Jays Run | George Bell |
| RBI | Gary Sheffield, Brewers |
| Blue Jays RBI | Fred McGriff |
| Single | Kelly Gruber, Blue Jays |
| Double | Paul Molitor, Brewers |
| Triple | Jay Buhner, Mariners (June 18, 1989) |
| Home run | Fred McGriff, Blue Jays (June 5, 1989) |
| Grand slam | Terry Steinbach, Athletics (July 16, 1989) |
| Blue Jays grand slam | Glenallen Hill (September 1, 1989) |
| Inside-the-park home run | Rance Mulliniks, Blue Jays (July 11, 1991) |
| Stolen base | Fred McGriff, Blue Jays (June 5, 1989) |
| Sacrifice hit | Robin Yount, Brewers (June 5, 1989) |
| Sacrifice fly | Robin Yount, Brewers (June 5, 1989) |
| Cycle | George Brett, Royals (July 25, 1990) |
| Blue Jays cycle | Jeff Frye (August 17, 2001) |

==== Pitching ====
| Statistic | Details |
| Win | Don August |
| Blue Jays Win | John Cerutti (June 7, 1989) |
| Loss | Jimmy Key |
| Opposing Loss | Chris Bosio, Brewers (June 7, 1989) |
| Shutout | Bert Blyleven, Angels (July 18, 1989) |
| Blue Jays Shutout | John Cerutti (August 2, 1989) |
| Save | Dan Plesac, Brewers (June 5, 1989) |
| Blue Jays Save | David Wells (June 9, 1989) |
| Hit by pitch | Tony Fossas hit Lloyd Moseby, Brewers (June 7, 1989) |
| Wild pitch | Jimmy Key, Blue Jays (June 5, 1989) |
| Balk | Tony Fossas, Brewers (June 7, 1989) |
| No-hitter | Dave Stewart, Athletics (June 29, 1990) |

=== Stadium-related ===
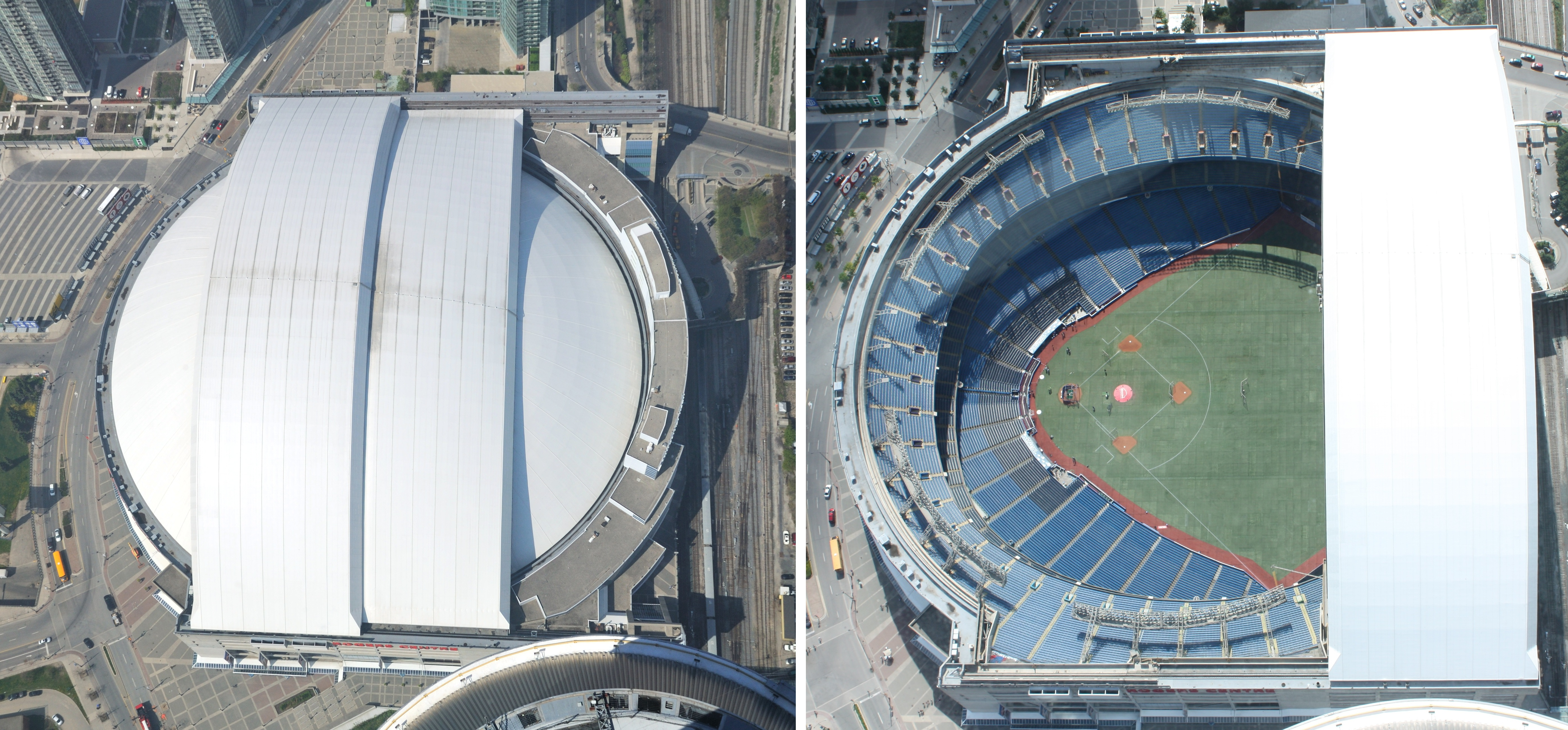
Left: Rogers Centre with roof closed Right: Rogers Centre with roof opened

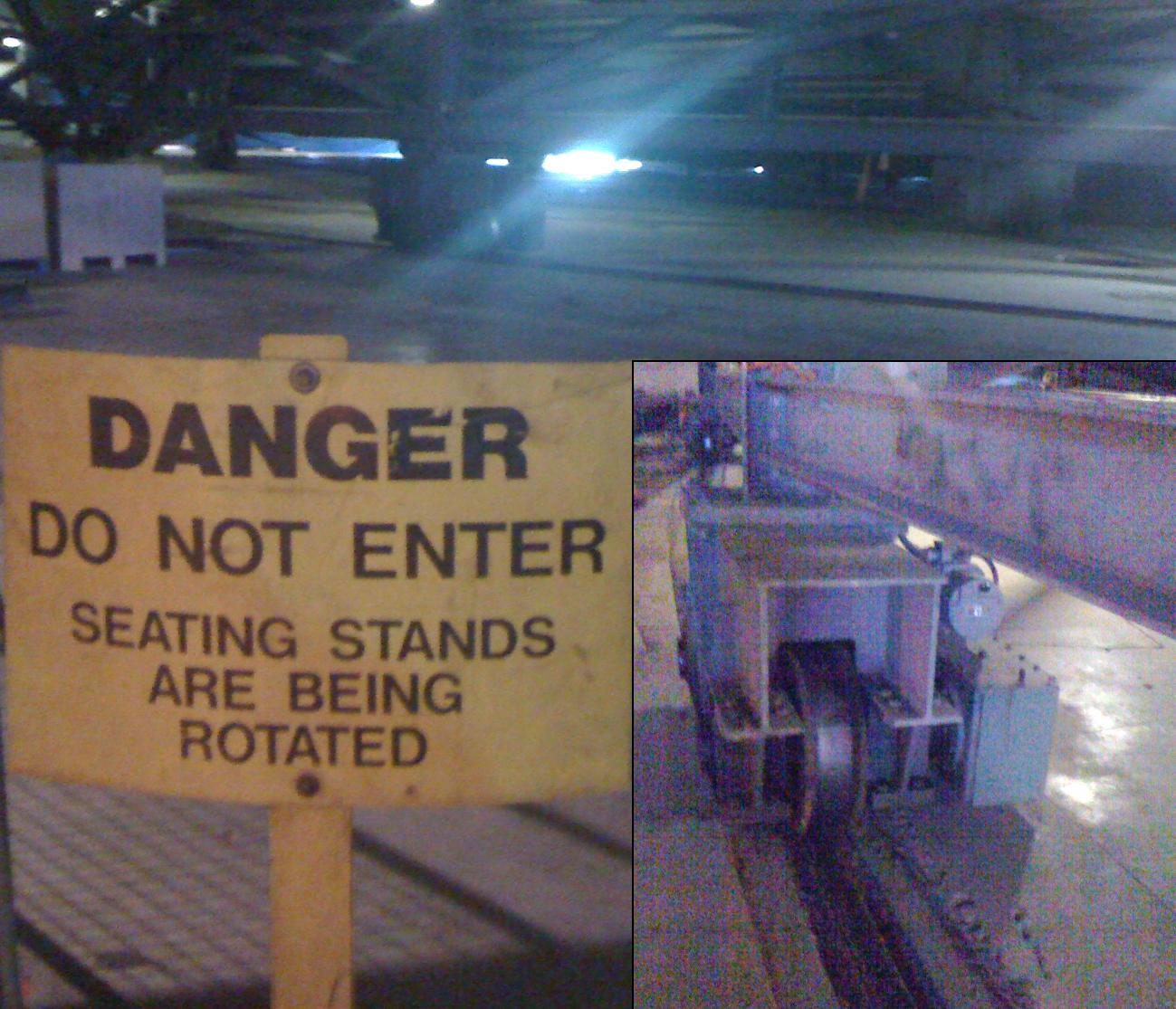
The field-level seating rotates on tracks to make the stadium easier to reconfigure.

- The stadium roof had a patent, which prevented its design from being easily copied: U.S. Patent #4676033. The patent was filed on May 1, 1986, and published June 30, 1987, to dome designers, architect Rod Robbie and structural engineer Michael Allen. The patent expired in 2006.
- The original mascot of the stadium was a turtle by the name of Domer. Domer has not been widely used since the mid-1990s, although he did make a return on June 6, 2014, to celebrate the 25th anniversary of the Rogers Centre.
- When the retractable roof is open, people standing on the observation deck of the nearby CN Tower can look down on the field.
- Over 50 million people have visited SkyDome/Rogers Centre.
- When the roof is open, 91 percent of the seats and 100 percent of the field is open to the sky, covering an area of 3.2 hectares (7.9 acres).
- The roof weighs 10,000 tonnes (11,000 short tons) and is held together by 250,000 bolts.
- The stadium's inward-looking hotel rooms have regular two-way windows, yielding instances of what some could consider indecent exposure and leading to nicknames such as "SexDome" and "Exhibitionist Stadium". When SkyDome first opened, a couple engaging in sexual intercourse was televised on the scoreboard Jumbotron during a baseball game, thanks to illumination from stadium lighting despite the room's lights being off. Days later, a man was caught masturbating during a game in full view of the packed stands. The man, later tracked down by a Sports Illustrated reporter, calmly said, "I thought they were one-way windows." Patrons now have to sign contracts stipulating they will not perform any lewd acts within view of the stadium. The last reported such instance occurred in 1996. Occasionally, broadcasts will zoom into humorous instances from these hotel rooms, such as a pillow fight during the 1992 World Series.
- When the stadium first opened, the Toronto Transit Commission was worried about the challenge of moving the large crowds. As a way to streamline the entry to the subway and to encourage public transit use to the stadium, all tickets for the first 30 days also worked as a Metropass, which was the commission's monthly pass.
- The stadium corporation has been requested to help in the planning of other venues from the U.S., the Netherlands, England, Australia, New Zealand, to Singapore, China and Germany (Source: Rogers Centre Press release).
- It was the most expensive stadium in both the Canadian Football League and Major League Baseball, constructed at a price of C$570 million (C$1.25 billion in 2025 dollars). This record was passed by the New Yankee Stadium at a cost of US$1.5 billion. If Montreal's Olympic Stadium (which was formerly the home field of the Expos, only used for CFL playoff games since the late 2000s and MLS playoff games since the mid-2010s) were counted, it would take the title, with a 1976 cost of C$1.6 billion (C$3.51 billion in 2025 dollars).
- Rogers Centre has hosted regular-season games of five of the six major professional sports leagues in the United States and Canada throughout the stadium's history; all but a National Hockey League (NHL) game, despite the Toronto Maple Leafs being in the NHL.

== In popular culture ==
- The stadium is the setting of the climax in the 2022 Pixar animated film Turning Red, in which the fictional boy band 4*Town performs a large-scale concert during which the stadium is partially destroyed. As the Toronto-set film takes place in 2002, the stadium is referred to by its original name, SkyDome.
- The stadium (referred to by its original name, SkyDome) serves as a major plot point in the 2025 comedy film Nirvanna the Band the Show the Movie, in which main characters Matt and Jay skydive off of the CN Tower with the hopes of landing into the stadium, however, the roof retracts as they land. As the film was shot guerrilla style, the filmmakers shot an alternate scene where Jay sneaks into the stadium dressed as the Blue Jays mascot, leading actor Jay McCarrol to get arrested.

== Gallery ==
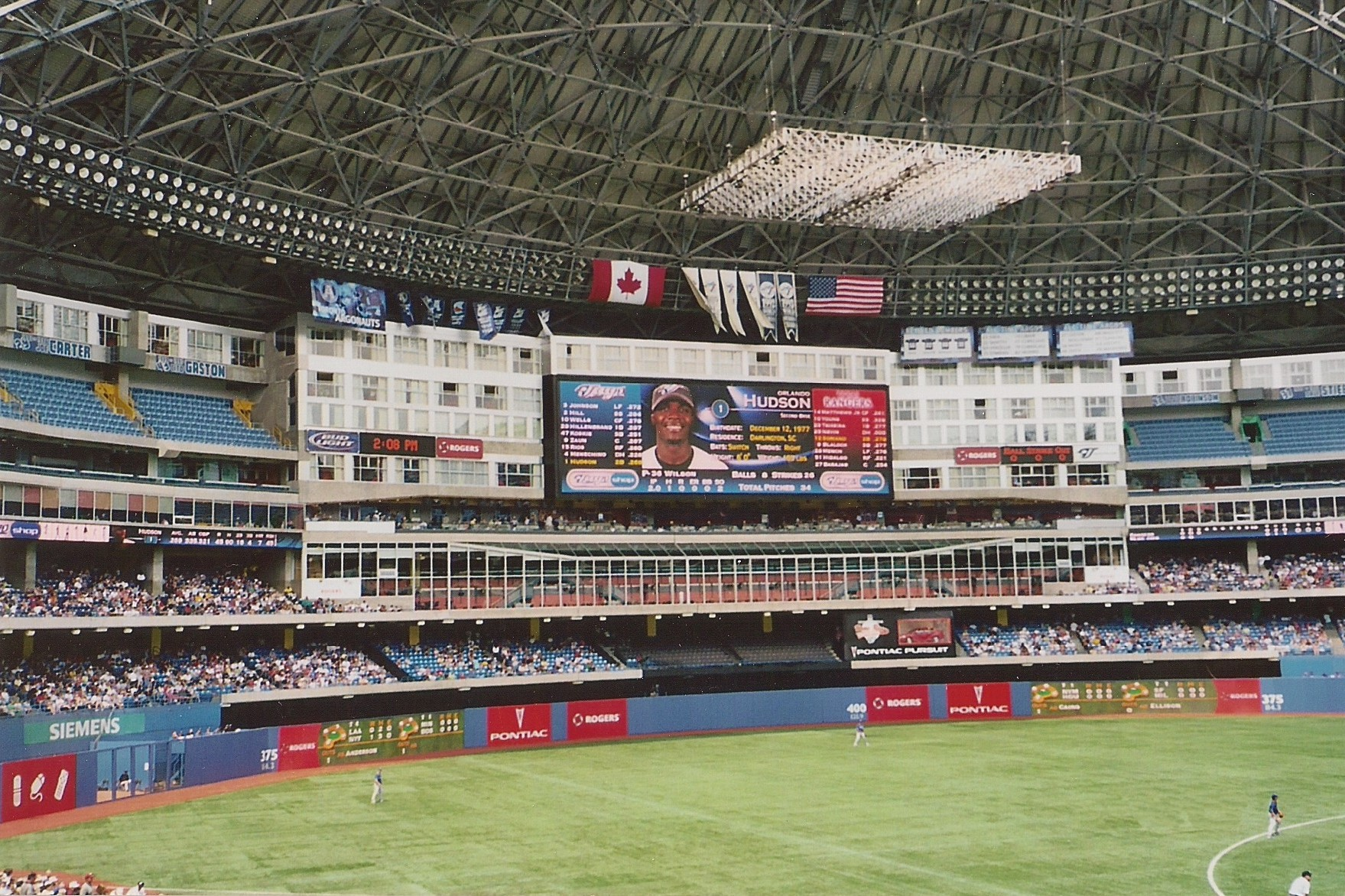
Interior of the stadium in 2005. Rogers refurbished several parts of the stadium after its acquisition, including replacing the Jumbotron with a Daktronics video display.

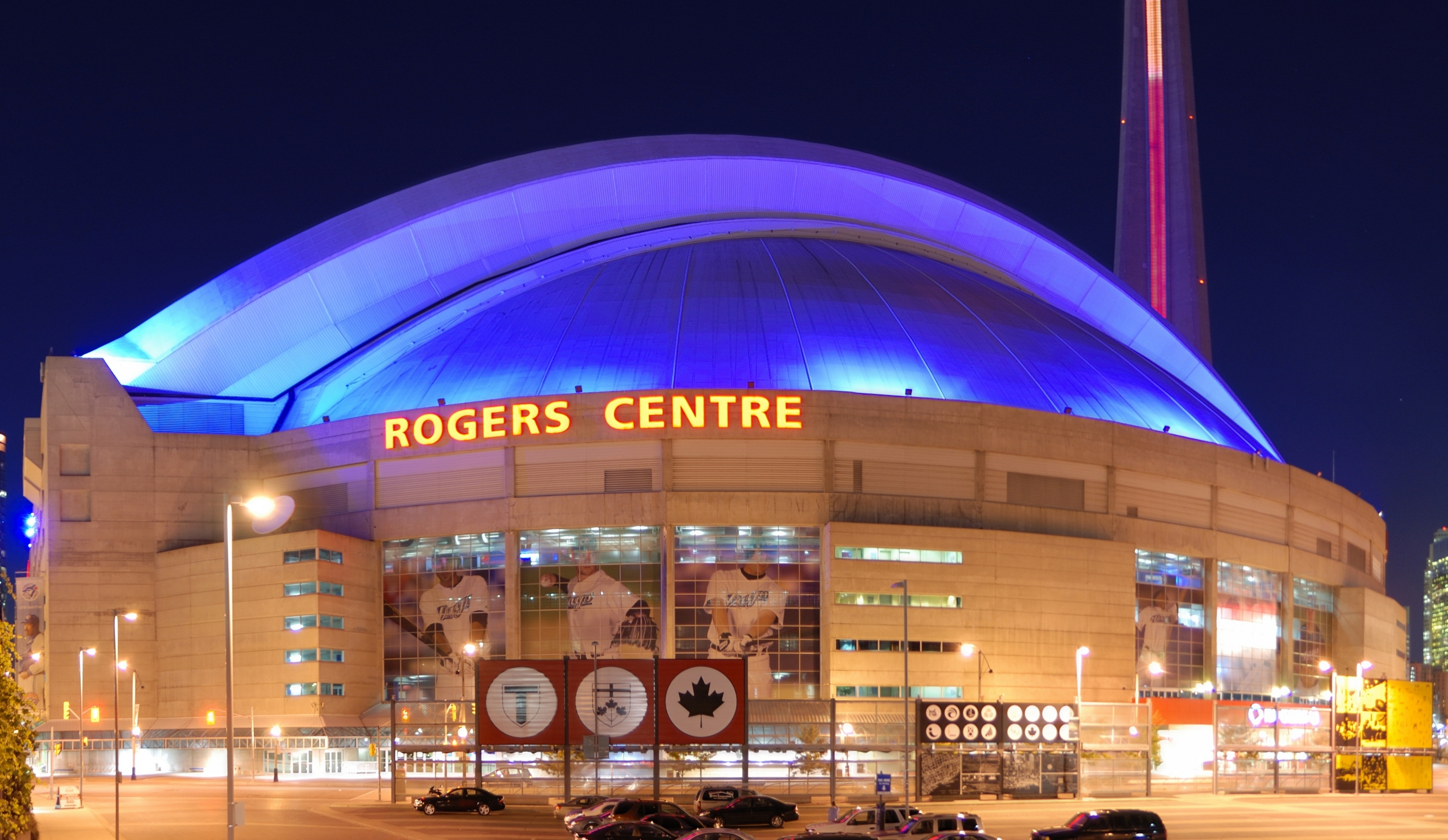
The roof of the Rogers Centre illuminated during the night in 2008.

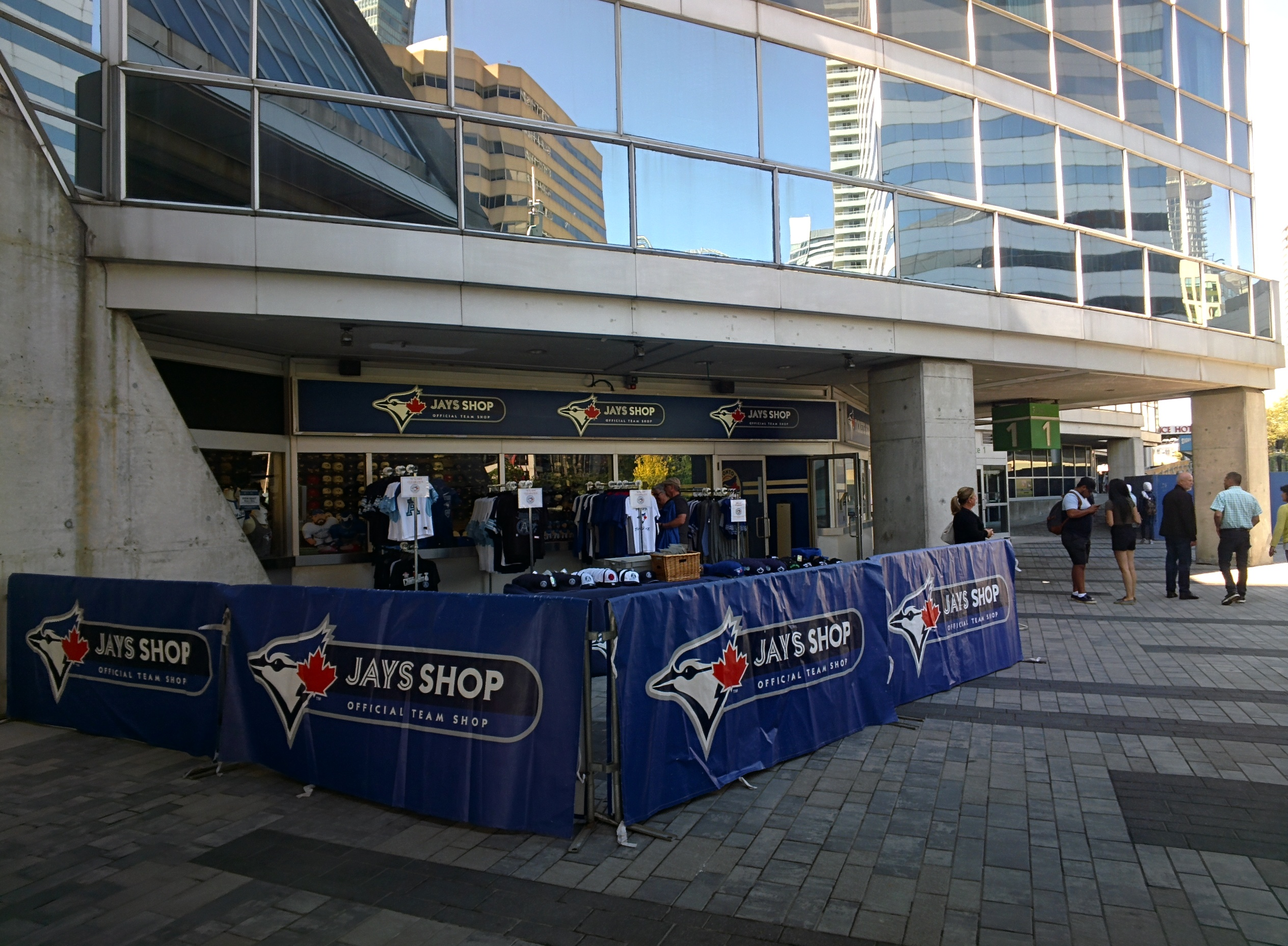
Exterior entrance to one of the two Jays Shop locations at Rogers Centre.

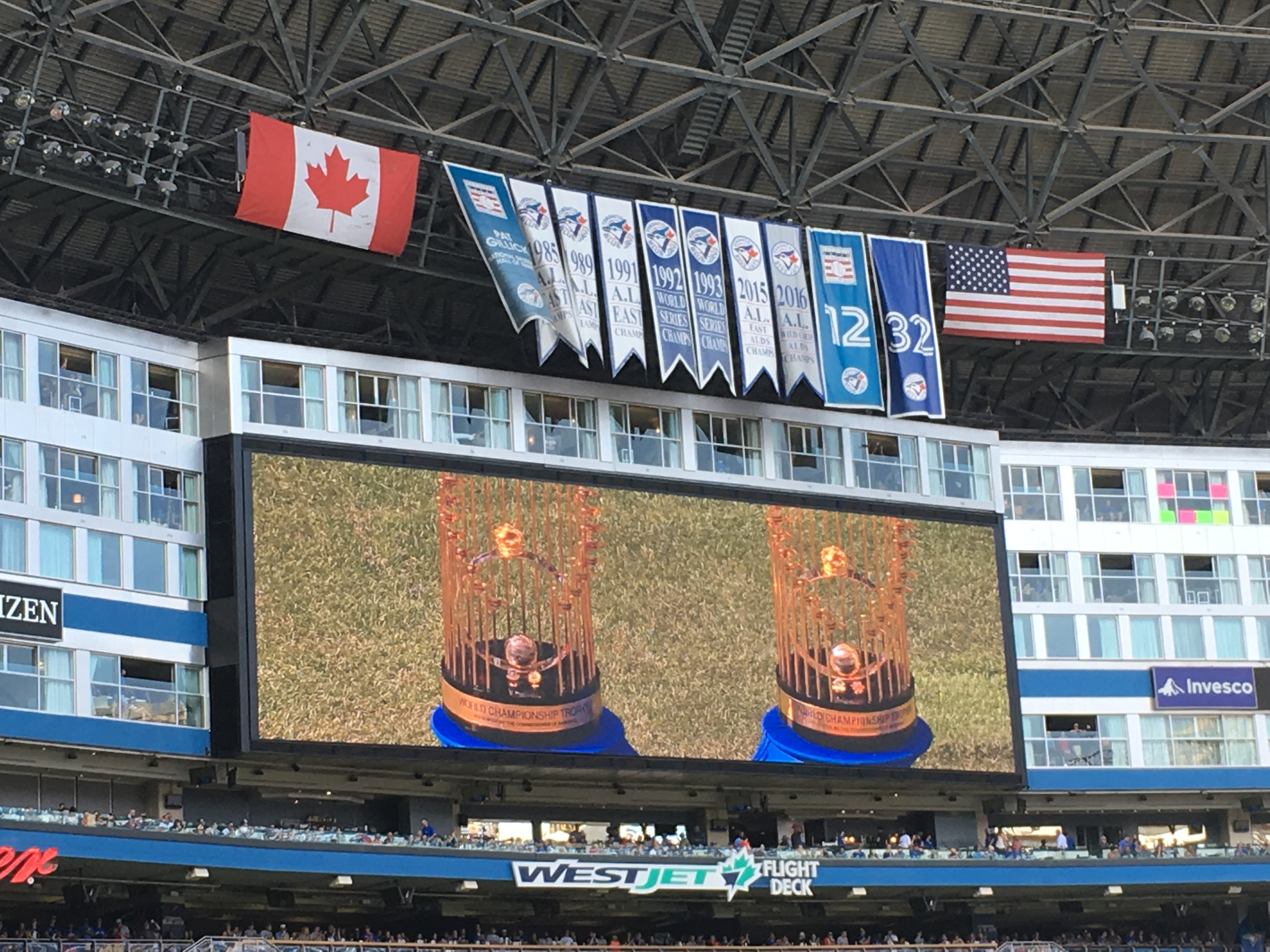
The stadium's video board in 2018, depicting the two Commissioner's Trophies won by the Blue Jays in 1992 and 1993

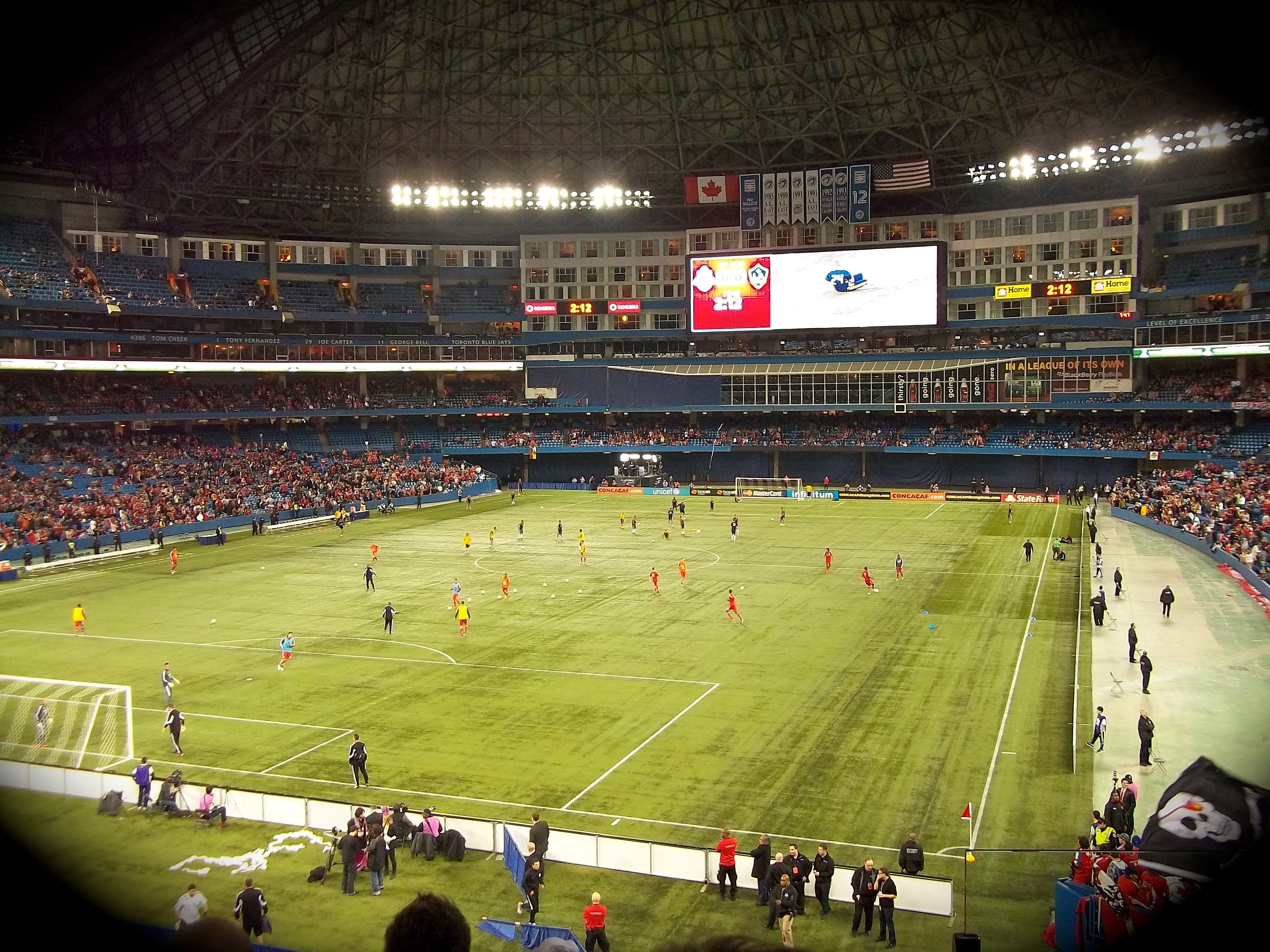
A soccer match between Toronto FC and the Los Angeles Galaxy in 2012

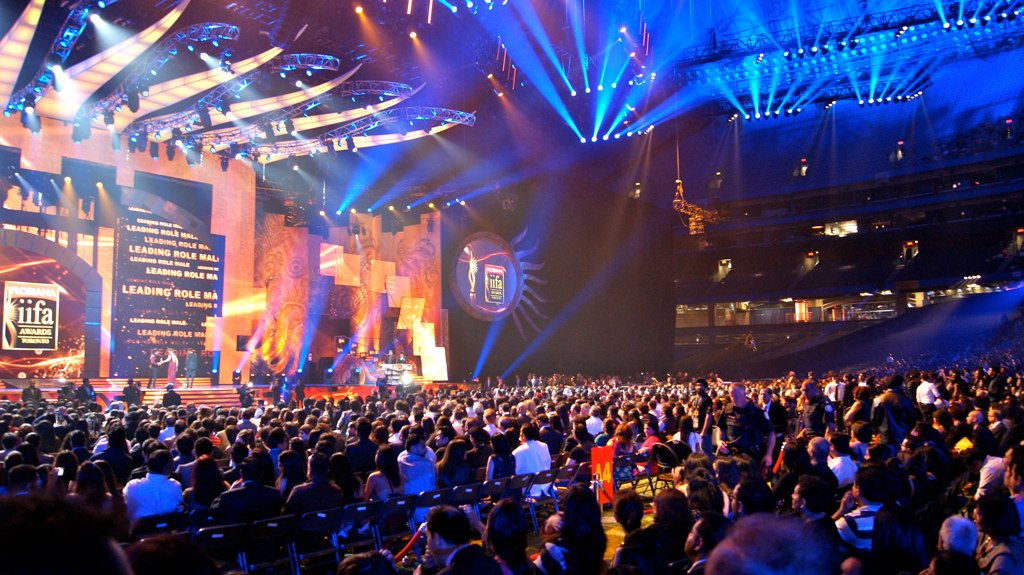
The 12th International Indian Film Academy Awards held at the Rogers Centre in June 2011

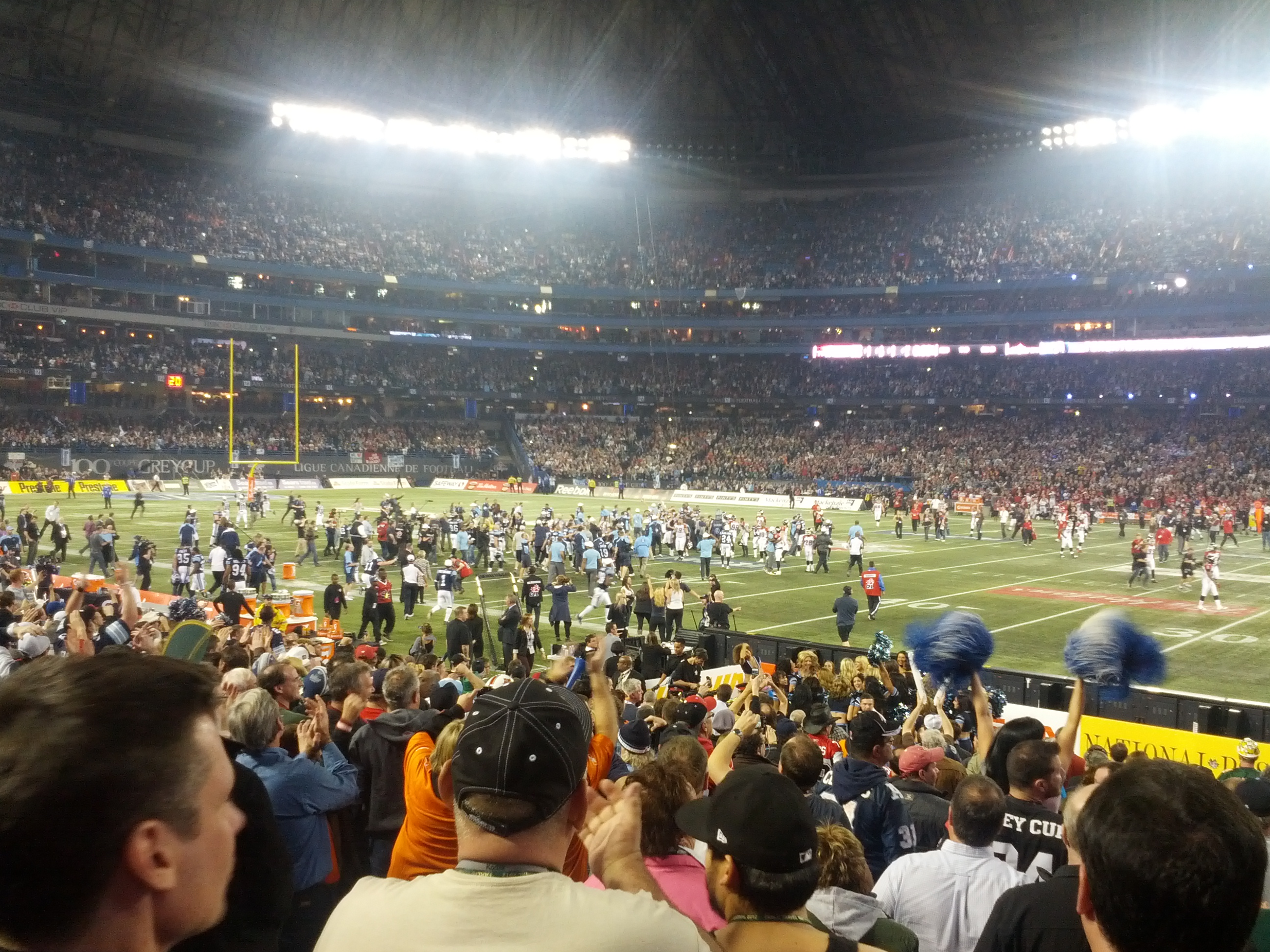
Members of the Toronto Argonauts run onto the field of the Rogers Centre, after winning the 100th Grey Cup in 2012

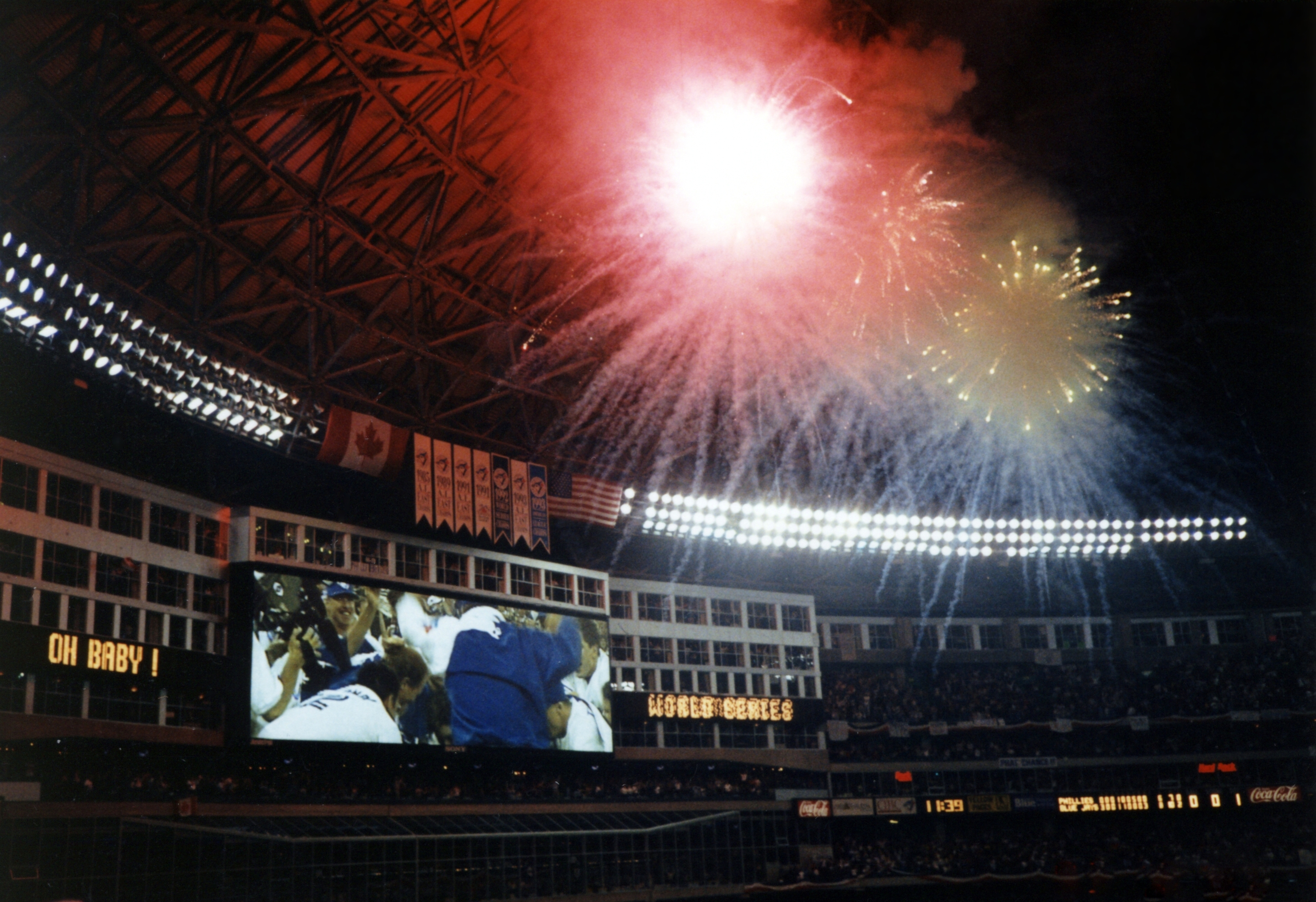
Fireworks at the stadium after the Toronto Blue Jays win the 1993 World Series

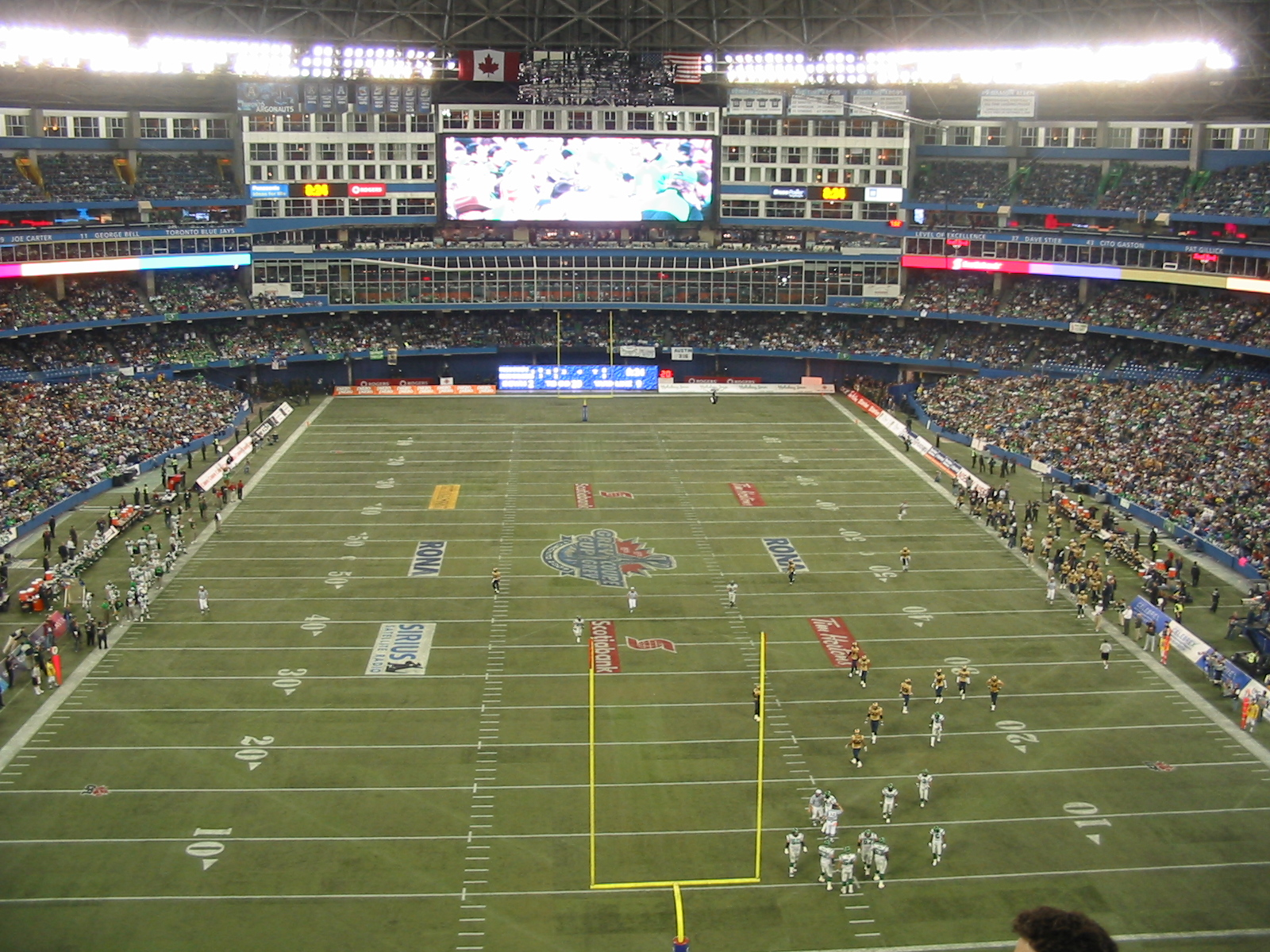
Scene from the 95th Grey Cup in 2007, the first Grey Cup to be held in the city since 1992

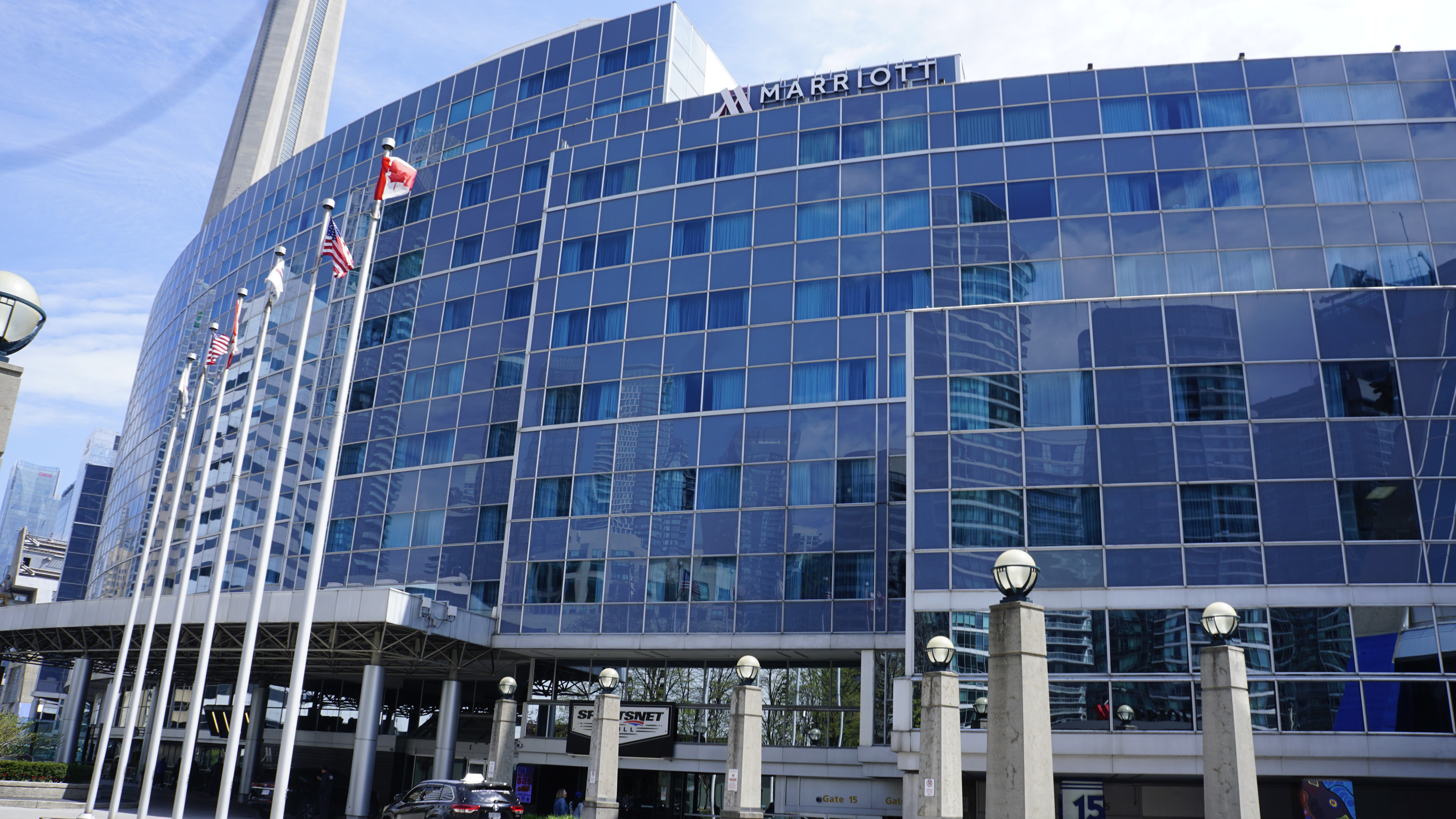
Marriott hotel connected to the stadium

== See also ==
- List of Canadian Football League stadiums
- List of current Major League Baseball stadiums
- List of stadiums in Canada

Events and tenants
| Preceded by Exhibition Stadium | Home of the Toronto Blue Jays; 1989 – present | Succeeded by current |
| Preceded by Exhibition Stadium | Home of the Toronto Argonauts; 1989 – 2015 | Succeeded by BMO Field |
| Preceded by first stadium | Home of the International Bowl; 2007 – 2010 | Succeeded by last stadium |
| Preceded by first arena | Home of the Toronto Raptors; 1995 – 1999 | Succeeded by Air Canada Centre |
| Preceded by Trump Plaza; Reliant Astrodome | Host of WrestleMania; 1990 (VI); 2002 (X8) | Succeeded by Los Angeles Memorial Sports Arena; Safeco Field |
| Preceded by Wrigley Field | Host of the MLB All-Star Game; 1991 | Succeeded by Jack Murphy Stadium |
| Preceded by Palacio Municipal de Deportes San Pablo; Seville | IAAF World Indoor Championships in Athletics; Venue; 1993 | Succeeded by Palau Sant Jordi; Barcelona |
| Preceded by Luna Park; Buenos Aires | FIBA World Cup; Final Venue; 1994 | Succeeded by Olympic Indoor Hall; Athens |
| Preceded by Estadio Jalisco; Guadalajara | Pan American Games; Opening and Closing Ceremonies; 2015 | Succeeded by Estadio Nacional; Lima |
