= Cito Gaston =

American baseball player and manager (born 1944)

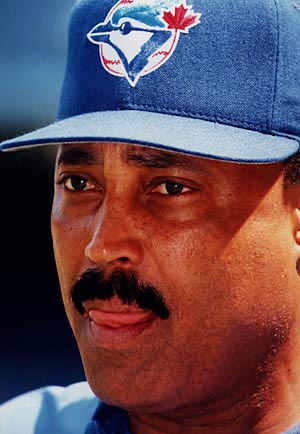
- Outfielder / Manager
- Born: March 17, 1944 (age 82); San Antonio, Texas, U.S.
- Batted: Right Threw: Right

MLB debut
- September 14, 1967, for the Atlanta Braves

Last MLB appearance
- October 1, 1978, for the Pittsburgh Pirates

MLB statistics
- Batting average: .256
- Home runs: 91
- Runs batted in: 387
- Managerial record: 894–837
- Winning %: .516
- Stats at Baseball Reference
- Managerial record at Baseball Reference

Teams
- As player: Atlanta Braves (1967); San Diego Padres (1969–1974); Atlanta Braves (1975–1978); Pittsburgh Pirates (1978); As manager: Toronto Blue Jays (1989–1997, 2008–2010); As coach: Toronto Blue Jays (1982–1989, 2000–2001)

Career highlights and awards
- All-Star (1970); 2× World Series champion (1992, 1993); Toronto Blue Jays Hall of Excellence

Member of the Canadian

Baseball Hall of Fame
- Induction: 2002

Clarence Edwin "Cito" Gaston (/ˈsiːtoʊ ˈɡæstən/; born March 17, 1944) is an American former Major League Baseball (MLB) outfielder, coach and manager. His major league career as a player lasted from 1967 to 1978, most notably with the San Diego Padres and Atlanta Braves. He spent his entire managerial career with the Toronto Blue Jays, becoming the first African-American manager in Major League Baseball history to win a World Series title.

Gaston managed the Toronto Blue Jays from 1989 to 1997, then again from 2008 to 2010. During this time, he managed the Blue Jays to four American League East division titles (1989, 1991, 1992 and 1993), two American League pennants (1992 and 1993) and two World Series titles (1992 and 1993).

== Personal life ==
Gaston grew up in San Antonio and Corpus Christi, Texas, where his father was a semi-truck driver. His career ambitions were either to be a truck driver like his father, or make it into the Major Leagues. He adopted his nickname 'Cito' in preference to his given name 'Clarence'. Gaston later told Toronto Blue Jays broadcasters the name was taken from a Mexican-American wrestler he watched as a young man in Texas. Other reports state Gaston was given this nickname from a friend named Carlos Thompson who thought Gaston resembled a well known Mexican wrestler named "Cito".

As a player with the Atlanta Braves, he was the roommate of Hank Aaron. Gaston credits Aaron with teaching him "how to be a man; how to stand on my own."

Gaston has been married three times. His first marriage ended in divorce with Gaston citing his baseball career as the reason. His second marriage to a Canadian woman, Denise, lasted from the early 80s to the early 2000s. Since 2003, Gaston has been married to Lynda, both residing in Oldsmar, Florida.

== Playing career ==
=== United States ===
Primarily a center fielder, Gaston began his decade-long playing career in 1967 with the Atlanta Braves, appearing in nine games. The following year he was selected by the San Diego Padres in the expansion draft, first playing for them in 1969. He had his best individual season in 1970, when he batted .318 (the highest batting average by a Padre prior to Tony Gwynn's arrival) with 29 home runs, 92 runs scored and 93 RBI, and was selected to the National League All-Star team. The rest of Gaston's career did not live up to his All-Star season success. Gaston never hit more than 17 home runs or knocked in more than 61 runs in any season with the Padres (until 1974) or the Braves (1975–1978).

=== Venezuela ===
In the Venezuelan Professional Baseball League, Gaston played with the Cardenales de Lara (1967–68), the Navegantes del Magallanes (1968–72, 1975–76) and the Tiburones de La Guaira (1976–77). Gaston hit 31 home runs and drove in 207 runs in 310 games (regular season).

== Managerial career ==
Cito Gaston is a member of the Toronto Blue Jays' Level of Excellence.

=== Pre-World Series seasons ===
Gaston became the hitting coach for the Toronto Blue Jays in 1982. The Blue Jays won their first division title in 1985 with Gaston as hitting coach. He remained the hitting instructor until May 15 1989, when he took over managerial duties from Jimy Williams, when the team was suffering through an unexpectedly bad start. Gaston originally declined the offer to be manager when Williams was fired. He told Ebony magazine: "When I was offered the job as manager, I didn't want it. I was happy working as the team's hitting instructor". It was only when his players encouraged him to take the job did he reconsider the offer.

Gaston was able to take superstars and mold them into a team. Under Gaston's leadership, Toronto transformed from a sub-.500 team (12–24 under Jimy Williams) to the eventual division winners, going 89–73 (77–49 under Gaston). Toronto's success under Gaston was not short-lived, as they finished second in the division behind Boston the following year and won the division again in 1991, 1992 and 1993.

=== World Series seasons ===
As a coach and manager, Gaston was considered a player's manager. He was a soft-spoken and steady influence during years that saw a large group of talented, high-salaried players grace the Blue Jays uniform. The franchise led the Major Leagues in attendance each year from 1989 to 1992, setting new records each of the latter three years, riding high from a dedicated fan base and following the Blue Jays' move into the SkyDome a few weeks after Gaston became manager. The resulting financial success allowed for major free agent signings, including Jack Morris and Dave Winfield ahead of the 1992 season, and Dave Stewart and Paul Molitor for 1993. The Blue Jays also retained core All-Stars such as Joe Carter, Devon White, Roberto Alomar, and John Olerud. Carter credits Gaston for the team's championships:

Cito knows how to work with each individual, treating everyone like a human being. He knows exactly what to say, when to say it, what to do and how to go about doing it. When you have a manager like that, it makes you want to play for the guy. We'd go to war for him. What Cito has done for the Blue Jays can't be taken lightly.

Gaston had worked with players at an individual level as a hitting instructor and did the same as manager. He was known for his open communication with his players. He was a successful game strategist, effectively handling National League rules during World Series games in Atlanta and Philadelphia. In the six road games during World Series play, the Jays went 4–2, including the title clincher in Game 6 of the 1992 World Series in Atlanta. The 1992 World Series victory was the first for a non-American team, and Gaston was the first African-American manager to win a World Series. The Blue Jays followed their 1992 success with a repeat victory in the 1993 World Series, an impressive feat, given that the Jays had lost starting position players Manuel Lee, Kelly Gruber, Candy Maldonado and Dave Winfield, starting pitchers Jimmy Key, David Cone and Dave Stieb, relievers Tom Henke and David Wells and bench players Derek Bell and Pat Tabler during the off-season following 1992.

=== All-Star manager ===
Gaston managed the American League team in the 1993 and 1994 All-Star Games, since he was the manager of the American League champions in 1992 and 1993. He was criticized for selecting six Blue Jays to the 1993 roster, but was unapologetic, stating all six were World Champions and two were future Hall of Famers. Gaston's prediction proved correct, as two of those players (Roberto Alomar and Paul Molitor) have been voted into the National Baseball Hall of Fame.

In the 1993 All-Star Game held at Oriole Park at Camden Yards, he was criticized for not getting Orioles pitcher Mike Mussina into the game. Mussina got up in the ninth inning to warm up in the bullpen. Mussina later claimed that he was simply doing a between-start workout, but some interpreted it as an attempt to force Gaston to put him into the game. As angry fans jeered in dismay, incredulous that Gaston would not use the popular local player and believing Mussina had been sent to warm up for no reason, Gaston instead allowed Blue Jays pitcher Duane Ward to close out the victory for the American League. Orioles fans did not like this perceived snub, later wearing T-shirts that said "Cito sucks" and carrying signs with the phrase, "Will Rogers never met Cito Gaston", referencing Rogers' famous line, "I never met a man yet that I didn't like."

=== After the World Series ===
Gaston's fortunes, like those of the Blue Jays franchise as a whole, faded after the championship years. The World Series winning clubs had dissipated because of aging players, increased post-Series salary demands, and the failure of new owner Interbrew (which acquired founding owner Labatt in 1995) to raise the budget substantially. After Major League Baseball solved its labor problems in 1994, Pat Gillick and eventually Paul Beeston left the organization and annual attendance began to drop considerably, but the Blue Jays were still trying to compete in the American League East and in 1997 signed free agent Roger Clemens. In April of that year, during a pre-game interview, Gaston accused specific members of Toronto's sports media (Toronto Sun columnist Steve Simmons, The Globe and Mail sports editor Dave Langford, and Fan 590 sports talk show host Bob McCown) of racism against him, stating "There's a couple (of sports writers) who continue to take shots at me for no reason at all. I just wonder if they would take the same shot at me if I was white." After the game against the Oakland A's on April 17, Gaston spoke briefly about his pre-game comments. "I've got one statement that I'm going to say, and I'm not going to say another word", Gaston said. "Whatever has been said, whatever has been written, if it has offended someone and it's unjustly offended them, I apologize. If it hasn't, then I don't apologize."

Gaston had been criticized for not giving playing time to young players such as Shawn Green and Carlos Delgado. When the team could not stay over the .500 mark, Gaston was fired by Gillick's successor as general manager, Gord Ash. Gaston forced Ash's hand by telling his boss that he was taking a vacation at season's end and would not be around for the usual post season evaluation process. He was replaced by then-pitching coach Mel Queen on an interim basis for the last week of the 1997 season. Joe Carter wore Gaston's No. 43 on his jersey for the remainder of the season in part to honor him and in part to express his displeasure at his firing. Gaston finished his first stint as manager with a 683–636 regular season record and 18–16 post–season record.

Gaston was a final candidate for the Detroit Tigers manager's job in the 1999–2000 season and was the runner-up in the Chicago White Sox manager position in the 2003–2004 off season. Sox GM Kenny Williams, who had played under Gaston in Toronto, had him as one of two finalists for the job but decided to hire Ozzie Guillén. Gaston had several offers to rejoin major league teams as a hitting instructor, namely the Kansas City Royals, but declined offers. After interviewing unsuccessfully for several other managerial jobs, Gaston said that he would only manage again if he were hired directly without an interview. Gaston turned down an opportunity with the Los Angeles Dodgers in 2004.

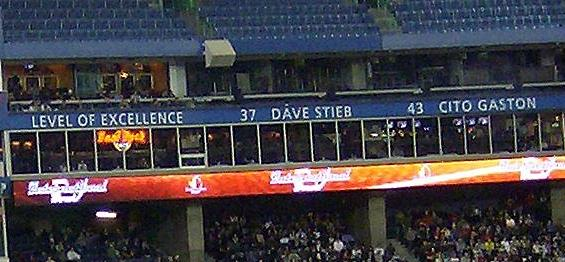
Cito Gaston's name is honoured by the Toronto Blue Jays in Rogers Centre.

Gaston rejoined the team as a hitting coach after the 1999 season under manager Buck Martinez but was not retained after a disappointing 2001 campaign and the sale of the franchise to Rogers Communications. In 2002, he was hired by the Jays for a third time, as special assistant to president and chief executive officer Paul Godfrey.

=== Managerial return ===
On June 20, 2008, Gaston was rehired as the manager of the Blue Jays to replace John Gibbons. It was his first managerial job at the major-league level since being fired by the Blue Jays 11 years earlier, which was unusual for a World Series-winning manager. The team's record was 35–39 when Gaston and his coaching staff took over, after which the Blue Jays went 51–37 for the remainder of the season which included a late ten-game winning streak and the team finished fourth in the American League East. On September 25, 2008, it was announced that Gaston had signed a two-year extension that would keep him as manager until 2010. He announced on October 30, 2009, that he would retire after the 2010 season.

The 2009 season started with promise, as they were in 1st place of the AL East after winning 27 of their first 41 games. However, a May sweep at the hands of the Red Sox started a slog in which they went on a nine-game losing streak. The division lead faltered not long after that, and by the All-Star break they were under .500, which they stayed for the rest of the season. Their finish of 75-87 was the first losing season for the Jays since 2005. On October 3, an online column by Fox Sports baseball writer Ken Rosenthal reported of a mutiny in the Blue Jays' clubhouse against Gaston by his players and some members of his coaching staff. Rosenthal cited unnamed sources who claimed that the mutiny was a result of his impatience with the players after they started losing, partially reflected with players getting less playing time, his lack of communication, including his inability to properly communicate substitutions, and his negativity, especially when it came to the younger players who required more positive reinforcement. A day after the report, Blue Jays first baseman Lyle Overbay was quoted as being one of the players who was surprised over his lack of playing time as well as wanting Gaston to improve his communication, stating "More than anything, I want to try to figure out what to expect for next year. It kind of caught me off-guard a little bit when I wasn't playing. ... (Gaston) never really said a lot. As we were winning, he was kind of sitting on the back burner, watching us play good." When asked about the report on the clubhouse mutiny, Gaston replied that he was surprised that such criticism existed. "If you've got two or three or four guys in there that have a problem, then you don't have to win anything, do you? You might have to certainly deal with those guys, but you don't have to win the clubhouse back. I don't think that you can ... rely (on a few) players to find out (if there's a problem). I think you need to talk to all of them. If it comes up to 50 percent, then, hey, maybe we've got a problem. I'd like to know what the problem is because I can't be any fairer than I've been." It was also reported that the discord came between holdover coaches from the previous Jays manager in John Gibbons with pitching coach Brad Arnsberg and bench coach Brian Butterfield and Gaston and his side of coaches such as Gene Tenace. Later in the month, with the Jays hiring a new general manager in Alex Anthopoulos to replace J.P. Ricciardi, it was announced that Gaston would fulfill the last season of his contract for 2010 while shuffling a few members of his coaching staff (such as firing Arnsberg along with Tenace retiring) before Gaston would become a consultant effective in 2011.

The 2010 season saw them play moderately better, albeit with the same finish as before. They never led the division after April nor fell too far under .500, having just one losing month in June while finishing 4th with a record of 85-77. On June 1, Fan 590 broadcaster Mike Wilner had an argument during a media scrum with Gaston about his field level decision making. Wilner detailed the confrontation on his blog. The following day, Fan 590 - a station of Blue Jays owner Rogers Communications - announced he would not be covering the team for several days, but refused to specify the reason.

Gaston retired following the 2010 season.

== Managerial record ==
Team	Year	Regular season					Postseason			
Team	Year	Games	Won	Lost	Win %	Finish	Won	Lost	Win %	Result
TOR	1989	126	77	49	.611	1st in AL East	1	4	.200	Lost ALCS (OAK)
TOR	1990	162	86	76	.531	2nd in AL East	–	–	–	–
TOR	1991	129	72	57	.558	1st in AL East	1	4	.200	Lost ALCS (MIN)
TOR	1992	162	96	66	.593	1st in AL East	8	4	.667	Won World Series (ATL)
TOR	1993	162	95	67	.586	1st in AL East	8	4	.667	Won World Series (PHI)
TOR	1994	115	55	60	.478	3rd in AL East	–	–	–	–
TOR	1995	144	56	88	.389	5th in AL East	–	–	–	–
TOR	1996	162	74	88	.457	4th in AL East	–	–	–	–
TOR	1997	157	72	85	.459	fired	–	–	–	–
TOR	2008	88	51	37	.580	4th in AL East	–	–	–	–
TOR	2009	162	75	87	.463	4th in AL East	–	–	–	–
TOR	2010	162	85	77	.525	4th in AL East	–	–	–	–
Total		1731	894	837	.516		18	16	.529	

== Awards and honors ==
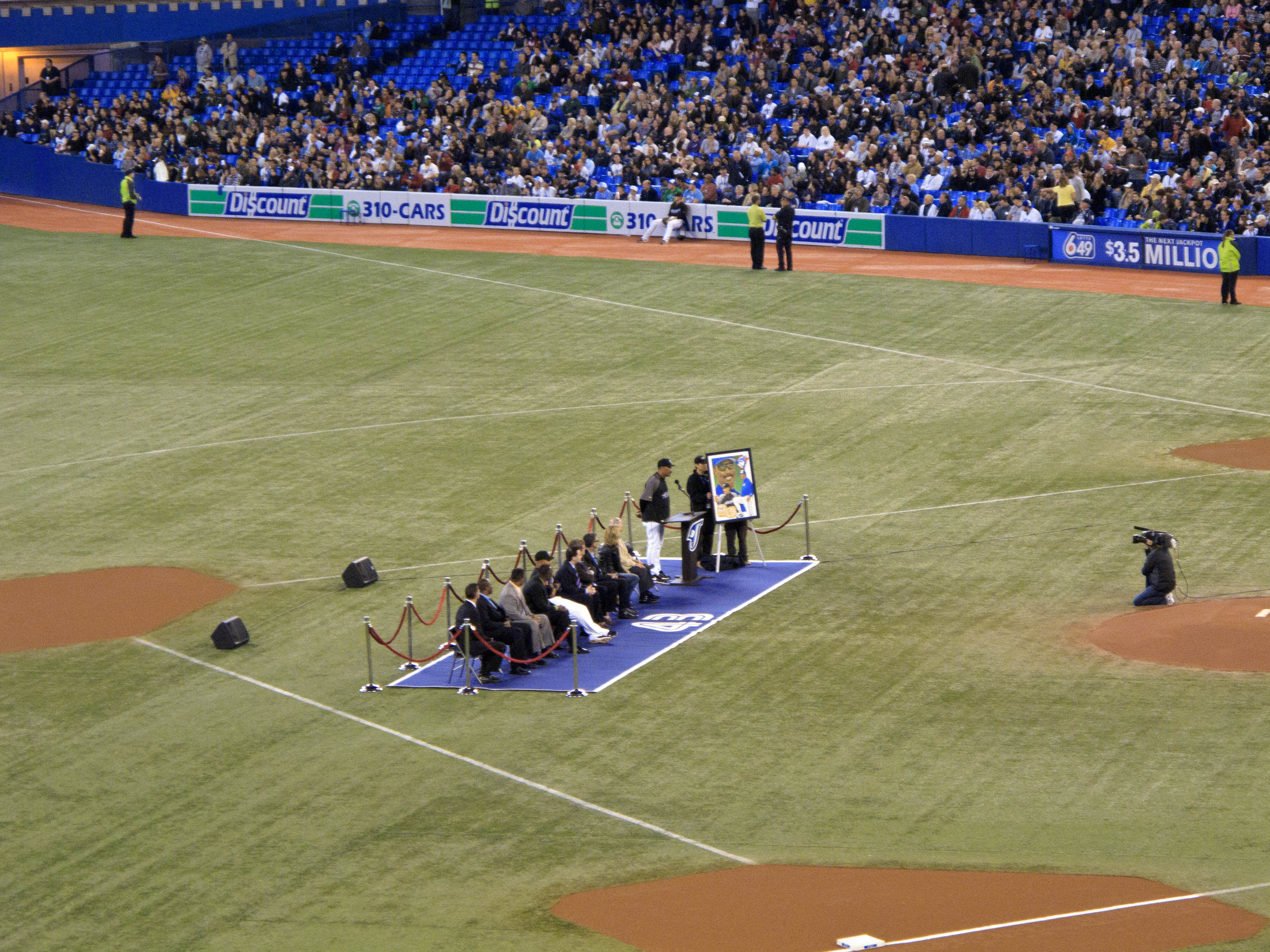
"Thank You Cito Night" on September 29, 2010, in Toronto

- In 1970, Gaston was selected for the All-Star Game as a reserve outfielder.
- Also in 1970, Gaston received the San Diego Padres team MVP award.
- In 1989, Gaston was the "Baseball Man of the Year" in Canada.
- In 1993, Gaston was named The Sporting News Sportsman of the Year alongside Pat Gillick.
- Managed the American League team in the 1993 Major League Baseball All-Star Game.
- Managed the American League team in the 1994 Major League Baseball All-Star Game.
- The University of Toronto granted Gaston an Honorary Doctor of Laws degree in June 1994.
- In 1999, Gaston's Blue Jays uniform name and number (#43) were honoured by addition to the Rogers Centre's Blue Jays "Level of Excellence".
- In 2002, Gaston was elected into the Canadian Baseball Hall of Fame.
- Gaston was inducted into the San Antonio Sports Hall of Fame in 2006.
- In 2008, Gaston was presented a Negro League Hall of Fame Legacy Award (Jackie Robinson Award).
- In 2011, Gaston was inducted into the Ontario Sports Hall of Fame.
- In 2012, Gaston was inducted into the Navegantes del Magallanes Hall of Fame.
- In 2023, Gaston was announced as one of the eight managers, executives, and umpires on the 2023 National Baseball Hall of Fame's contemporary baseball era ballot.

== Notes ==
Sporting positions
Preceded by Bobby Doerr; Gary Matthews	Toronto Blue Jays hitting coach 1982–1989; 2000–2001	Succeeded by Gene Tenace; Mike Barnett
