= 1992 American League Championship Series =

1992 Major League Baseball playoff series

Team (Wins)	Managers	Season
Toronto Blue Jays (4)	Cito Gaston	96–66, .593, GA: 4
Oakland Athletics (2)	Tony La Russa	96–66, .593, GA: 6
- Dates: October 7–14
- MVP: Roberto Alomar (Toronto)
- Umpires: Don Denkinger (crew chief); Larry Young; Al Clark; Durwood Merrill; Joe Brinkman; Drew Coble

Broadcast
- Television: CBS, CTV
- TV announcers: Dick Stockton, Jim Kaat, Johnny Bench (Game 2) and Lesley Visser
- Radio: CBS; CJCL (Toronto); KSFO (Oakland)
- Radio announcers: Jim Hunter and Johnny Bench; Tom Cheek and Jerry Howarth on CJCL; Bill King, Lon Simmons, and Ray Fosse on KSFO

The 1992 American League Championship Series was a best-of-seven semifinal series in Major League Baseball’s 1992 postseason played between the Toronto Blue Jays and the Oakland Athletics from October 7 to 14, 1992. The Blue Jays won the series four games to two to advance to their first World Series, and became the first team outside the United States to win a pennant. The series was a rematch of the 1989 ALCS, which Oakland won in five games.

Blue Jays second baseman Roberto Alomar was named Most Valuable Player of the series. In six games, Alomar rapped 11 hits in 26 at bats for a .423 batting average, including a double and two home runs.

The Blue Jays would go on to defeat the Atlanta Braves in the World Series in six games to win their first World Series championship in franchise history.

== Background ==
Oakland finished the 1992 season with a 96–66 record (.593), clinching their fourth American League West title in five years by six games over the Minnesota Twins. The Blue Jays also finished 1992 with a 96–66 mark, claiming their second straight American League East championship by four games over the Milwaukee Brewers.

The Athletics clinched the West division on September 28. Although they were not playing that day, the Twins' 9–4 loss to the Chicago White Sox at home eliminated Minnesota from contention and gave the Athletics the crown. The race for the East division went down to the final weekend of the season, with the Brewers leapfrogging the Baltimore Orioles for second place in mid-September. However, Toronto pulled out a 3–1 defeat of the Detroit Tigers on October 3 to secure the division title.

The teams had split their season series at six wins each. 1992 ALCS was the first postseason series since the 1958 World Series to feature two teams with identical regular season records. Under the postseason format in effect since 1985, in cases where the division champions had identical records the determination of home field advantage reverted to the method used from 1969 through 1984. As a result, Toronto was awarded home field advantage as under that format the Eastern champion had home field advantage in even-numbered years.

== Summary ==
=== Toronto Blue Jays vs. Oakland Athletics ===
Toronto won the series, 4–2.

Game	Date	Score	Location	Time	Attendance
1	October 7	Oakland Athletics – 4, Toronto Blue Jays – 3	SkyDome	2:47	51,039
2	October 8	Oakland Athletics – 1, Toronto Blue Jays – 3	SkyDome	2:58	51,114
3	October 10	Toronto Blue Jays – 7, Oakland Athletics – 5	Oakland–Alameda County Coliseum	3:40	46,911
4	October 11	Toronto Blue Jays – 7, Oakland Athletics – 6 (11)	Oakland–Alameda County Coliseum	4:25	47,732
5	October 12	Toronto Blue Jays – 2, Oakland Athletics – 6	Oakland–Alameda County Coliseum	2:51	44,955
6	October 14	Oakland Athletics – 2, Toronto Blue Jays – 9	SkyDome	3:15	51,335

== Game summaries ==
=== Game 1 ===
Wednesday, October 7, 1992, at SkyDome in Toronto, Ontario

Team	1	2	3	4	5	6	7	8	9	R	H	E
Oakland	0	3	0	0	0	0	0	0	1	4	6	1
Toronto	0	0	0	0	1	1	0	1	0	3	9	0
WP: Jeff Russell (1–0) LP: Jack Morris (0–1) Sv: Dennis Eckersley (1); Home runs: OAK: Mark McGwire (1), Terry Steinbach (1), Harold Baines (1); TOR: Pat Borders (1), Dave Winfield (1)

The first game of the series had Oakland's Dave Stewart face off against Toronto's Jack Morris. The Athletics put up a three-spot against Morris in the second inning, as Mark McGwire and Terry Steinbach hit back-to-back home runs. Stewart held the Blue Jays scoreless until the fifth, when catcher Pat Borders homered to put Toronto on the board. Dave Winfield added another shot for Toronto in the sixth, and in the eighth a base hit by John Olerud scored Winfield to tie the game.

However, Oakland took the lead right back in the top of the ninth, when Harold Baines led off the inning with a home run. Athletics closer Dennis Eckersley then shut down the Blue Jays in the bottom half of the inning to preserve a 4–3 victory and give the Athletics a 1–0 lead in the series.

=== Game 2 ===
Thursday, October 8, 1992, at SkyDome in Toronto, Ontario

Team	1	2	3	4	5	6	7	8	9	R	H	E
Oakland	0	0	0	0	0	0	0	0	1	1	6	0
Toronto	0	0	0	0	2	0	1	0	X	3	4	0
WP: David Cone (1–0) LP: Mike Moore (0–1) Sv: Tom Henke (1); Home runs: OAK: None; TOR: Kelly Gruber (1)

Game 2 saw Oakland's Mike Moore face the Blue Jays' David Cone. The game was initially a pitchers' duel, as Moore and Cone put up zeroes for the first four innings. In the bottom of the fifth, however, Toronto's Kelly Gruber hit a two-run home run off Moore to give the Blue Jays the lead. In the seventh, Gruber doubled, took third on a grounder, and came home on a Manuel Lee sacrifice fly to extend the Toronto lead to three. The Athletics avoided a shutout in the top of the ninth, when Rubén Sierra tripled and scored on a single by Baines, but that was all they could muster against Toronto closer Tom Henke. The Blue Jays took the second game and tied the series at a game apiece.

=== Game 3 ===
Saturday, October 10, 1992, at Oakland–Alameda County Coliseum in Oakland, California

Team	1	2	3	4	5	6	7	8	9	R	H	E
Toronto	0	1	0	1	1	0	2	1	1	7	9	1
Oakland	0	0	0	2	0	0	2	1	0	5	13	3
WP: Juan Guzmán (1–0) LP: Ron Darling (0–1) Sv: Tom Henke (2); Home runs: TOR: Roberto Alomar (1), Candy Maldonado (1); OAK: None

The series shifted to Oakland for Game 3, as Juan Guzmán took the hill for the Blue Jays while Ron Darling toed the rubber for the Athletics. Toronto struck in the second, when Winfield reached on an error by Athletics' third baseman Carney Lansford, moved to third on a wild pitch by Darling, and scored on a single by Candy Maldonado. Roberto Alomar hit an opposite-field home run in the fourth to give the Blue Jays a 2–0 lead, but in the bottom half of the inning the Athletics tied the game with RBI base hits by Baines and Steinbach.

However, the very next inning, Maldonado hit a homer, and after Oakland manager Tony La Russa gave Darling the hook in the seventh, the Blue Jays added two unearned runs due to an error by Lance Blankenship and a triple by Lee, making it a 5–2 game. Although the Athletics cut Toronto's lead down to a run, the Blue Jays tacked on single runs in the eighth and ninth. Henke retired the Athletics in order in the ninth, giving Toronto a 7–5 victory and a 2–1 edge in the series.

=== Game 4 ===
Sunday, October 11, 1992, at Oakland–Alameda County Coliseum in Oakland, California

Team	1	2	3	4	5	6	7	8	9	10	11	R	H	E
Toronto	0	1	0	0	0	0	0	3	2	0	1	7	17	4
Oakland	0	0	5	0	0	1	0	0	0	0	0	6	12	2
WP: Duane Ward (1–0) LP: Kelly Downs (0–1) Sv: Tom Henke (3); Home runs: TOR: John Olerud (1), Roberto Alomar (2); OAK: None

For the fourth game, Toronto threw Morris against Oakland's Bob Welch. In the second inning, Olerud tagged Welch for an opposite-field solo homer to give the Blue Jays the lead. However, the Athletics came back in a big way with a five-run third and tacked on another run in the sixth when Sierra doubled Rickey Henderson home, giving Oakland a seemingly secure 6–1 advantage. In the top of the eighth, however, La Russa pulled Welch, who had been cruising along, and went to his bullpen. The Blue Jays capitalized by scoring three runs off hits by Joe Carter, Olerud, and Maldonado, cutting the Athletics' lead to 6–4. After the Blue Jays had scored one run and had two men on base, La Russa sent in his closer, Dennis Eckersley, in hopes of preventing a huge rally by Toronto.

In the top of the ninth, La Russa sent Eckersley back in to shut down the Blue Jays. Eckersley had given up two of Toronto's three runs in the previous inning, but La Russa decided to stay with his best closer. Devon White led off with a triple to left. Roberto Alomar hit a high line drive to right field that disappeared behind the wall for a game-tying two-run home run. This turned out to be a crucial point of the series, as it forced the game into extra innings and gave the Blue Jays a chance to win.

Indeed, in the top of the 11th, Toronto came through. Derek Bell walked, moved to third on a Maldonado single, and came home on a sacrifice fly by Borders to give the Blue Jays a 7–6 lead. Henke shut the door on the Athletics in the bottom of the inning, handing Toronto a 3–1 series lead.

=== Game 5 ===
Monday, October 12, 1992, at Oakland–Alameda County Coliseum in Oakland, California

Team	1	2	3	4	5	6	7	8	9	R	H	E
Toronto	0	0	0	1	0	0	1	0	0	2	7	3
Oakland	2	0	1	0	3	0	0	0	X	6	8	0
WP: Dave Stewart (1–0) LP: David Cone (1–1); Home runs: TOR: Dave Winfield (2); OAK: Rubén Sierra (1)

Game 5 pitted Toronto's Cone against Oakland's Stewart. In the bottom of the first, Sierra cracked a two-run home run off Cone. In the third inning an error by Cone on a pickoff attempt proved costly, as Henderson advanced to 3rd and then scored on a single by Jerry Browne. Although Winfield broke the shutout with a homer off Stewart in the fourth, the unearned runs continued to hurt the Blue Jays, as the Athletics added three runs in the fifth (only one of which was earned) for a 6–1 lead. Toronto managed only one more run in the seventh when White singled Gruber home, and Stewart went the distance as the Athletics took a 6–2 victory and cut the Blue Jays' advantage in the series to 3–2. This would be the last Major League Baseball playoff game to be played at the Oakland Coliseum with the old, classic open air view of the Oakland foothills, prior to the installment of Mount Davis in 1996.

=== Game 6 ===
Wednesday, October 14, 1992, at SkyDome in Toronto

Team	1	2	3	4	5	6	7	8	9	R	H	E
Oakland	0	0	0	0	0	1	0	1	0	2	7	1
Toronto	2	0	4	0	1	0	0	2	X	9	13	0
WP: Juan Guzmán (2–0) LP: Mike Moore (0–2); Home runs: OAK: None; TOR: Joe Carter (1), Candy Maldonado (2)

The series came back to Toronto for Game 6, with Guzmán going against Moore. In the bottom of the first, the Blue Jays took a lead they would never relinquish, as White reached on an error by Henderson and scored on a homer by Carter, making it 2–0. In the third, Olerud lashed an RBI double and Maldonado followed with a three-run shot, extending the advantage to 6–0. McGwire put Oakland on the board in the sixth with a single that scored Sierra, but the Athletics could only manage another run against the Blue Jays. In the ninth, Henke took the mound and induced a flyout from Sierra to end a 9–2 win, making Toronto the first non-U.S.-based team to win a pennant in Major League history.

== Composite box ==
1992 ALCS (4–2): Toronto Blue Jays over Oakland Athletics

Team	1	2	3	4	5	6	7	8	9	10	11	R	H	E
Toronto Blue Jays	2	2	4	2	5	1	4	7	3	0	1	31	59	8
Oakland Athletics	2	3	6	2	3	2	2	2	2	0	0	24	52	7
Total attendance: 293,086 Average attendance: 48,848

== Broadcasting notes ==
CBS' coverage of the 1992 ALCS led to conflicts with the presidential debates that year. CBS did not cover one of the debates because Game 4 of the series went into extra innings. By the time it ended, the debate was almost over. Over the course of Game 2, Jim Kaat was stricken with a bad case of laryngitis. As a result, Johnny Bench had to come over from the CBS Radio booth and finish the game with Dick Stockton as a "relief analyst." There was talk that if Kaat's laryngitis did not get better, Don Drysdale was going to replace Kaat on TV for Game 3 while Bench would continue to work on CBS Radio. Locally, the series was called on CJCL-AM in Toronto by Tom Cheek and Jerry Howarth and KSFO-AM in Oakland by Bill King, Lon Simmons, and Ray Fosse.

== Aftermath ==
Toronto signed Dave Stewart as a free agent from the Athletics during the offseason; he went 12–8 and was the American League Championship Series MVP the next year. Rickey Henderson was also traded from the Athletics to the Blue Jays at the 1993 trade deadline.

The Athletics would go into a slump beginning in 1993, from which they would not recover until the Moneyball era, nearly a decade later.

The 1992 ALCS began a streak of playoff success for Toronto-based teams over their San Francisco Bay Area counterparts. In 1994, the Toronto Maple Leafs defeated the San Jose Sharks 4–3 in the NHL Western Conference semifinals, then in 2019, the Toronto Raptors won the NBA championship over the Golden State Warriors 4–2.
