= 1991 American League Championship Series =

23rd edition of Major League Baseball's American League Championship Series

Team (Wins)	Managers	Season
Minnesota Twins (4)	Tom Kelly	95–67, .586, GA: 8
Toronto Blue Jays (1)	Cito Gaston	91–71, .562, GA: 7
- Dates: October 8–13
- MVP: Kirby Puckett (Minnesota)
- Umpires: Larry Barnett (crew chief); Mark Johnson; Rocky Roe; Tim Welke; Mike Reilly; Jim McKean

Broadcast
- Television: CBS
- TV announcers: Dick Stockton and Jim Kaat
- Radio: CBS
- Radio announcers: Jim Hunter and Johnny Bench

The 1991 American League Championship Series was a best-of-seven semifinal series in Major League Baseball’s 1991 postseason played between the Minnesota Twins and the Toronto Blue Jays from October 8 to 13. The Twins defeated the favored Blue Jays, winning the Series four games to one. Minnesota would go on to face (and ultimately defeat) the Atlanta Braves in seven games in 1991 World Series, ranked by ESPN as the greatest ever played.

This was the first postseason series played entirely indoors, as both teams played in domed stadiums, with Toronto's retractable roof remaining closed for games three, four and five.

Minnesota outfielder Kirby Puckett was named the Series MVP, based on his .429 batting average, two home runs, and five RBI.

As of 2026, this is the last time the Twins won the AL pennant, and is the most recent conference championship won by a Minneapolis–St. Paul-based team.

== Background ==
The Twins rose from last place in 1990 (a 74–88 record) and finished the 1991 regular season with a 95–67 record (.586), handily winning the American League West division crown by eight games over the Chicago White Sox. The Blue Jays were similarly successful during the 1991 season, compiling a 91–71 record (.562) and winning the American League East division by seven games over the Boston Red Sox and Detroit Tigers. The Twins and Blue Jays played their final regular season series against each other (after both teams had clinched their respective divisions and were resting their starters), with the Blue Jays winning two of the three games. Newspapers were predicting a series of tense and close contests in the following ALCS, as the Twins seemed to have the slightly stronger team, but the Blue Jays had won the season series between the two teams 8-4.

== Summary ==
=== Minnesota Twins vs. Toronto Blue Jays ===
Minnesota won the series, 4–1.

Game	Date	Score	Location	Time	Attendance
1	October 8	Toronto Blue Jays – 4, Minnesota Twins – 5	Hubert H. Humphrey Metrodome	3:17	54,766
2	October 9	Toronto Blue Jays – 5, Minnesota Twins – 2	Hubert H. Humphrey Metrodome	3:02	54,816
3	October 11	Minnesota Twins – 3, Toronto Blue Jays – 2 (10)	SkyDome	3:36	51,454
4	October 12	Minnesota Twins – 9, Toronto Blue Jays – 3	SkyDome	3:15	51,526
5	October 13	Minnesota Twins – 8, Toronto Blue Jays – 5	SkyDome	3:29	51,425

== Game summaries ==
=== Game 1 ===
Tuesday, October 8, 1991, at Hubert H. Humphrey Metrodome in Minneapolis, Minnesota

Team	1	2	3	4	5	6	7	8	9	R	H	E
Toronto	0	0	0	1	0	3	0	0	0	4	9	3
Minnesota	2	2	1	0	0	0	0	0	X	5	11	0
WP: Jack Morris (1–0) LP: Tom Candiotti (0–1) Sv: Rick Aguilera (1)

Game 1 saw a surprise starter for Toronto as Blue Jays manager Cito Gaston chose knuckleballer Tom Candiotti to face the Twins over his new young gun Juan Guzmán and his left-handed ace Jimmy Key. Twins manager Tom Kelly opted to counter with All-Star Game starter and Minnesota native Jack Morris. Gaston would draw questions later when the decision seemingly swung the series against Toronto.

In the bottom of the first, Dan Gladden singled and Chuck Knoblauch did the same. After a strikeout by Kirby Puckett, Twins first baseman Kent Hrbek flied out to center field, moving Gladden to third. Knoblauch stole second and with two on and two out, Chili Davis singled both home to give the Twins an early 2–0 lead.

In the second, the Twins added two more runs. Shane Mack singled off Candiotti, stole second, and moved to third on a line out to right by Mike Pagliarulo. He then scored on a Greg Gagne single, and consecutive singles again by Gladden and Knoblauch plated Gagne to give the Twins a 4–0 lead.

In the third, Davis walked with one out, stole second, and scored on a double by Mack. Candiotti's line read: 16 batters faced, five runs, eight hits, and four stolen bases. He was also responsible for Mack, perched on second. But reliever David Wells, as well as the rest of the Blue Jays relievers, shut down the Twins and held them scoreless for the rest of the game.

In the top of the fourth, the Blue Jays tried to claw back into the game. After a Roberto Alomar single, Joe Carter doubled and Blue Jays third base coach Rich Hacker sent Alomar home. Two perfect throws from the Twins nailed Alomar at the plate for the first out and the squelching of the Blue Jay rally. Carter went to third and scored on John Olerud's subsequent ground out to make the score 5–1.

In the sixth, the Blue Jays got within a single run. Five consecutive singles by Devon White, Alomar, Carter, Olerud, and Kelly Gruber with only one out plated three runs and made the score 5–4. But Carl Willis came on to get the last two outs, and the Minnesota relief corps held the Blue Jays the rest of the way for a 5–4 victory for the Twins and starter Jack Morris. Rick Aguilera got the save while Candiotti was saddled with the loss.

The victory gave the Twins a 1–0 lead in games in the ALCS. It also put them one win short of tying the post-season record for most consecutive wins at home held by the New York Yankees.

=== Game 2 ===
Wednesday, October 9, 1991, at Hubert H. Humphrey Metrodome in Minneapolis, Minnesota

Team	1	2	3	4	5	6	7	8	9	R	H	E
Toronto	1	0	2	0	0	0	2	0	0	5	9	0
Minnesota	0	0	1	0	0	1	0	0	0	2	5	1
WP: Juan Guzmán (1–0) LP: Kevin Tapani (0–1) Sv: Duane Ward (1)

The number-two pitchers on each staff squared off in Game 2, as Juan Guzmán took the hill for the Blue Jays against Kevin Tapani for the Twins. A win would not only give the Twins a 2–0 lead, but would also enable them to set the record for the most consecutive home field wins in post-season history, as they had won their first seven post-season games (including the 1987 playoffs and World Series) in the Metrodome. Unfortunately for the Twins, the Blue Jays came out swinging and held on for a 5–2 win.

Devon White began the scoring in the top of the first when he singled, stole second, moved to third on Roberto Alomar's bunt, and scored on Joe Carter's single to give the Blue Jays a 1–0 lead. In the third, White and Alomar struck for two more Blue Jays runs when White doubled, moved to third on Alomar's single, and both scored after Alomar stole second and Kelly Gruber singled both home with two outs. The Blue Jays led, 3–0. The Twins got a run back in the bottom of the third when Chuck Knoblauch singled, stole second, and scored on Kirby Puckett's single. Knoblauch scored again in the sixth when he walked, moved to second on Puckett's ground out, and scored on a single by Brian Harper. The run cut Toronto's lead to 3–2.

Game 2 was a show for Devon White and Roberto Alomar, and in the seventh they put the contest out of reach. After Manuel Lee walked, the Twins relieved Tapani with Steve Bedrosian. White walked to put runners on first and second with one out. Alomar's single scored Lee, and White moved to third on an error by Shane Mack. White then scored his third run of the game on a sacrifice fly by Joe Carter, giving the Blue Jays a 5–2 lead. That was how the game ended.

Guzman was the winning pitcher, and Tapani the loser. Duane Ward got his first post-season save. The Blue Jays ended Minnesota's quest for a record home winning streak and both teams headed to Canada with the games count standing at one win apiece.

=== Game 3 ===
Friday, October 11, 1991, at SkyDome in Toronto

Team	1	2	3	4	5	6	7	8	9	10	R	H	E
Minnesota	0	0	0	0	1	1	0	0	0	1	3	7	0
Toronto	2	0	0	0	0	0	0	0	0	0	2	5	1
WP: Mark Guthrie (1–0) LP: Mike Timlin (0–1) Sv: Rick Aguilera (2); Home runs: MIN: Mike Pagliarulo (1); TOR: Joe Carter (1)

With the series tied at one win apiece, the teams ventured across the border to Toronto's SkyDome where Jimmy Key squared off against the Twins' 20-game winner, Scott Erickson. The Blue Jays quickly jumped out to a 2–0 lead in the first when with two out, Joe Carter homered, John Olerud walked, Kelly Gruber singled, and Candy Maldonado doubled Olerud home. Erickson was able to get the third out retiring Rance Mulliniks.

The Twins got on the board in the fifth. Shane Mack led off and hit a triple against the right field wall after Carter twisted an ankle trying to reach the ball and make a circus catch. On Kent Hrbek's grounder to second, Roberto Alomar attempted to get Mack out at the plate, but Mack beat the throw to score. In the bottom half of the inning, manager Tom Kelly, responding to an inordinate number of throws over to first base and believing that Erickson was hesitant to pitch to Carter, took the unusual step of making a pitching change in the middle of an at-bat, bringing on reliever David West inheriting a 1-2 count. West then struck out Carter, Gruber and Maldonado. The Twins tied it in the sixth when Chuck Knoblauch doubled and scored on Kirby Puckett's single with a head-first slide at the plate. The tie got rid of Jimmy Key as David Wells came on in relief.

The score stayed 2–2 until the tenth. Reliever Mike Timlin came on and after retiring Gene Larkin, gave up an eventual game-winning homer to pinch-hitter Mike Pagliarulo, who was hitting for Scott Leius. Kelly had made an unexpected lineup change having Greg Gagne bat seventh and Leius ninth, ultimately setting up Pagliarulo to face Timlin. Rick Aguilera closed out the bottom of the tenth with a 1–2–3 inning to give the Twins a 3–2 win and a 2–1 lead in games. The ankle injury to Joe Carter, the Blue Jays' most influential hitter, proved pivotal. Although Carter played in the next two games as the designated hitter, he was in obvious discomfort and was largely a non-factor, getting only one more hit in those two games.

=== Game 4 ===
Saturday, October 12, 1991, at SkyDome in Toronto

Team	1	2	3	4	5	6	7	8	9	R	H	E
Minnesota	0	0	0	4	0	2	1	1	1	9	13	1
Toronto	0	1	0	0	0	1	0	0	1	3	11	2
WP: Jack Morris (2–0) LP: Todd Stottlemyre (0–1); Home runs: MIN: Kirby Puckett (1); TOR: None

For the fourth game, Morris returned to the mound for Minnesota against Toronto's Todd Stottlemyre. The Blue Jays took the lead in the bottom of the second, when Candy Maldonado singled to center, took second on a wild pitch by Morris, and came home on a single by Pat Borders. The Twins, however, came back in a big way in the fourth – Kirby Puckett hit a home run, Chili Davis, who had doubled, scored on a single by Mike Pagliarulo, and a two-run single by Dan Gladden plated both Pagliarulo and Shane Mack. This turn of events gave the Twins a 4–1 lead. In the sixth, Brian Harper hit a leadoff double off of David Wells, then scored on Mike Pagliarulo's one-out double. Dan Gladden's RBI single off of Jim Acker made it 6–1 Twins. In the bottom of the inning, Kelly Gruber doubled with one out off of Jack Morris and scored on Pat Borders's two-out double. In the seventh, an error on Harper's ground ball with runners on first and second off of Mike Timlin allowed another Twins run to score. Next inning, Puckett's sacrifice fly with runners on first and third off of Timlin made it 8–2 Twins. In the ninth, Chili Davis hit a leadoff double off of Bob Macdonald and scored on Shane Mack's sacrifice fly after moving to third on another fly out. In the bottom of the inning, Roberto Alomar's RBI single with runners on first and third made it 9–3 Twins before Steve Bedrosian retired the next two batters to end the game, putting the Twins one win away from the World Series.

=== Game 5 ===
Sunday, October 13, 1991, at SkyDome in Toronto

Team	1	2	3	4	5	6	7	8	9	R	H	E
Minnesota	1	1	0	0	0	3	0	3	0	8	14	2
Toronto	0	0	3	2	0	0	0	0	0	5	9	1
WP: David West (1–0) LP: Duane Ward (0–1) Sv: Rick Aguilera (3); Home runs: MIN: Kirby Puckett (2); TOR: None

With their backs against the wall, the Blue Jays sent Candiotti to the hill for Game 5 against the Twins' Tapani. In the top of the first, Puckett hit a home run to give Minnesota a 1–0 lead. The Twins added another run the next inning, when Davis singled, moved to second and then third on consecutive passed balls by Toronto catcher Pat Borders, then came home on a single by Mack.

In the bottom of the second, Tapani struck out Maldonado and Blue Jays manager Cito Gaston disagreed with home plate umpire Mike Reilly. He continued arguing until Reilly finally tossed him. The ejection fired up Toronto who took a 3–2 lead in their half of the third courtesy of an RBI single by Alomar, an RBI double by Carter, and a groundout by Olerud. Alomar added a two-run single in the fourth to give the Blue Jays a 5–2 lead.

In the sixth, the Twins stormed back to tie the game. Mack singled, stole second, then moved to third on a base hit by Pagliarulo. The Blue Jays' third baseman Gruber tried to nab Mack at the plate when Gladden hit into a fielder's choice, but Borders tagged with the wrong hand and Mack scored. Knoblauch followed by lashing a double to right field that scored both Pagliarulo and Gladden, and the game was knotted at 5.

In the eighth, Minnesota took the lead for good when Gladden singled and stole second, and after Knoblauch walked, came home on a single by Puckett, who took second on a throw home. Hrbek then drove both Knoblauch and Puckett in with a single to left, giving the Twins an 8–5 advantage. Rick Aguilera shut the door on the Blue Jays in the bottom of the ninth, giving the Twins their second American League pennant in five years.

== Composite box ==
1991 ALCS (4–1): Minnesota Twins over Toronto Blue Jays

Team	1	2	3	4	5	6	7	8	9	10	R	H	E
Minnesota Twins	3	3	2	4	1	7	1	4	1	1	27	50	4
Toronto Blue Jays	3	1	5	3	0	4	2	0	1	0	19	43	7
Total attendance: 263,987 Average attendance: 52,797
