= 1992 World Series =

89th edition of Major League Baseball's championship series

Team (Wins)	Managers	Season
Toronto Blue Jays (4)	Cito Gaston	96–66, .593, GA: 4
Atlanta Braves (2)	Bobby Cox	98–64, .605, GA: 8
- Dates: October 17–24
- Venue(s): Fulton County Stadium (Atlanta); SkyDome (Toronto)
- MVP: Pat Borders (Toronto)
- Umpires: Jerry Crawford (NL), Mike Reilly (AL), Joe West (NL), Dan Morrison (AL), Bob Davidson (NL), John Shulock (AL)
- Hall of Famers: Blue Jays: Pat Gillick (GM); Roberto Alomar; Jack Morris; Dave Winfield; Braves: Bobby Cox (manager); John Schuerholz (GM); Tom Glavine; John Smoltz

Broadcast
- Television: CBS, simulcast in Canada on CTV
- TV announcers: Sean McDonough and Tim McCarver
- Radio: CBS; CJCL (TOR); WGST (ATL)
- Radio announcers: Vin Scully and Johnny Bench (CBS); Tom Cheek and Jerry Howarth (CJCL); Skip Caray, Pete Van Wieren, Ernie Johnson, Joe Simpson and Don Sutton (WGST)
- ALCS: Toronto Blue Jays over Oakland Athletics (4–2)
- NLCS: Atlanta Braves over Pittsburgh Pirates (4–3)

The 1992 World Series was the championship series of Major League Baseball's (MLB) 1992 season. The 89th edition of the World Series, was a best-of-seven playoff, played between the American League (AL) champion Toronto Blue Jays and the National League (NL) champion Atlanta Braves. Toronto defeated Atlanta in six games, marking the first time a team based outside the United States won the World Series. Outside the NHL (Stanley Cup), the Blue Jays became the first Canadian sports team in a major North American league to win a championship since the Vancouver Whitecaps of the North American Soccer League won the Soccer Bowl in 1979. They remain the only Canadian team to have appeared in, and won, a World Series (which they would do again the following year in 1993). (Note: The Montreal Expos relocated to Washington, D.C. and became the Washington Nationals for the 2005 season.) The 1992 World Series was the first World Series in which games were played outside the United States, as well as the first to have games played in a stadium with a retractable roof, Toronto's SkyDome.

== Background ==
=== Toronto Blue Jays ===
The Blue Jays won the American League East Division title for the second consecutive season and third time in four years. They faced the winners of the West Division, the Oakland Athletics, in the American League Championship Series (ALCS). The Athletics were looking to advance to the World Series for the fourth time in five years, having previously been in the World Series in 1988, 1989, and 1990, winning it in 1989. The Blue Jays, meanwhile, were looking to become the first Canadian team to win a pennant. The Blue Jays lost the first game at home but then won the next three to take a commanding lead, eventually closing the series out at home in Game 6. This marked the first time a Toronto-based team had appeared in the championship round of either one of the four major North American leagues since the 1967 Stanley Cup Final.

=== Atlanta Braves ===
The Braves won the National League West Division for the second straight season and earned another matchup with the three-time defending East Division winners, the Pittsburgh Pirates, in the National League Championship Series (NLCS). The Braves won three of the first four games in the series, but the Pirates won the next two and were leading in the bottom of the ninth in Game 7 before the Braves rallied, capped off by a single by seldom-used pinch hitter Francisco Cabrera that drove in two runs and won the series.

== Summary ==
AL Toronto Blue Jays (4) vs. NL Atlanta Braves (2)

Game	Date	Score	Location	Time	Attendance
1	October 17	Toronto Blue Jays – 1, Atlanta Braves – 3	Atlanta–Fulton County Stadium	2:37	51,763
2	October 18	Toronto Blue Jays – 5, Atlanta Braves – 4	Atlanta–Fulton County Stadium	3:30	51,763
3	October 20	Atlanta Braves – 2, Toronto Blue Jays – 3	SkyDome	2:49	51,813
4	October 21	Atlanta Braves – 1, Toronto Blue Jays – 2	SkyDome	2:21	52,090
5	October 22	Atlanta Braves – 7, Toronto Blue Jays – 2	SkyDome	3:05	52,268
6	October 24	Toronto Blue Jays – 4, Atlanta Braves – 3 (11)	Atlanta–Fulton County Stadium	4:07	51,763

== Matchups ==
=== Game 1 ===
Saturday, October 17, 1992 8:29 pm (EDT) at Atlanta–Fulton County Stadium in Atlanta, Georgia 60 °F (16 °C), Mostly cloudy
Team	1	2	3	4	5	6	7	8	9	R	H	E
Toronto	0	0	0	1	0	0	0	0	0	1	4	0
Atlanta	0	0	0	0	0	3	0	0	X	3	4	0
WP: Tom Glavine (1–0) LP: Jack Morris (0–1); Home runs: TOR: Joe Carter (1); ATL: Damon Berryhill (1)

Braves fans had plenty to worry about in regard to both starting pitchers. Tom Glavine's postseason career had been less than stellar, including giving up eight runs in the second inning of Game 6 of the NLCS against Pittsburgh. Entering Game 1, Glavine's career post-season record was 1–5 despite two starts where he had pitched well and only given up one earned run each time. Glavine was 0–2 in those starts.

In addition to Glavine's struggles in the postseason, the Braves would be facing their nemesis from the previous postseason. Before the 1992 season, the Blue Jays signed the MVP of the 1991 World Series, Jack Morris. The Braves were more than familiar with Morris' work, as he had defeated them twice in three starts and only allowed three runs. One of the victories came in the decisive seventh game, where Morris pitched a ten-inning complete game shutout. Morris' results in 1992, however, were quite the opposite. Despite leading the Blue Jays with 21 wins in the regular season, Morris had not performed well in the postseason. He lost one of his two starts in the 1992 ALCS despite throwing a complete game and took a no-decision in his other start giving up five runs.

Toronto's other big offensive acquisition had been veteran Dave Winfield, who entered his 20th season in 1992 having yet to win a World Series ring. Winfield, primarily the team's designated hitter, paid dividends by recording his best batting average and runs batted in numbers in several years and hit two home runs in the ALCS. His presence in the lineup was one that manager Cito Gaston wanted to keep, which forced some maneuvering of the lineup for the games to be played in Atlanta under National League rules; Winfield's natural position was right field, which was manned by All-Star Joe Carter during the season. Therefore, for Game 1, Winfield was inserted into Carter's place in the outfield. Carter, in turn, played first base in place of normal starter John Olerud.

Both teams had early scoring opportunities but could not cash in on them. In the bottom of the first inning, Braves center fielder and lead off hitter Otis Nixon singled and stole second. After Jeff Blauser tried and failed to advance him on a bunt, Nixon reached third on a groundout by Terry Pendleton. Morris, however, struck out David Justice to end the inning. Toronto responded in the next half inning with Winfield reaching on a single. After Glavine struck out Candy Maldonado and got Kelly Gruber to pop out, Pat Borders singled to put two runners on. Glavine got out of the inning, though, by inducing Manuel Lee to ground into a fielder's choice that retired Borders at second.

Carter opened scoring in the series in the top of the fourth, pulling a solo home run. The Braves threatened with two outs in the bottom half of the inning. Morris walked Justice and Sid Bream after retiring Blauser and Pendleton to start the inning. Then, on his second pitch to Ron Gant, Morris threw a wild pitch, advancing the runners to second and third. Morris ended the threat, however, by striking out Gant.

After Glavine retired Toronto in order in the top of the fifth, Morris again ran into a jam in the Atlanta half of the inning. Like he had in the fourth, Morris retired the first two batters by getting Damon Berryhill to fly out to deep center field and retiring Mark Lemke on a groundout. But as he had in the previous inning, he extended the inning by walking Glavine and Nixon. Blauser struck out swinging to end the inning, keeping the shutout intact. To this point, Nixon's single in the first stood as the only Braves hit.

Morris went back to work in the bottom of the sixth after the Blue Jays again went down in order in the top half. He got Pendleton to ground out, but walked Justice for the second time in as many plate appearances. Bream followed with a single that advanced Justice to second, but was himself retired on a fielder's choice by Gant on the next at bat. Gant then stole second to put the go ahead run into scoring position.

Up stepped Berryhill, who had hit a deep fly ball against Morris the last time he had faced him. Berryhill later said he had gone up to the plate looking for Morris to throw him a forkball, as he had observed that Morris had been able to get several strikeouts with the pitch so far. The Braves’ catcher took advantage of a pitch that Morris was unable to get enough break on and drove it over the right field wall to give the Braves the lead. Morris said after the game that was the only forkball that caused him trouble.

The three-run home run would prove to be the only offense the Braves would need that night. Glavine retired the Blue Jays in order in the seventh, eighth, and ninth innings, while the Braves only managed to have one runner reach base against relievers Todd Stottlemyre and David Wells after Morris left the game following the sixth.

Glavine went the distance for the victory, only giving up four total hits. In taking the loss, Morris suffered his first career World Series defeat in his sixth start, with one no-decision. Berryhill's home run marked the first runs Morris had given up in the World Series since Pendleton hit a home run in the bottom of the third inning of Game 4 of the 1991 Series. Morris pitched an additional 3 1/3 innings in that game, all 10 in Game 7, and the first 5 2/3 innings of this game to run his World Series scoreless streak to 19 innings.

=== Game 2 ===
Sunday, October 18, 1992 8:29 pm (EDT) at Atlanta–Fulton County Stadium in Atlanta, Georgia 57 °F (14 °C), clear
Team	1	2	3	4	5	6	7	8	9	R	H	E
Toronto	0	0	0	0	2	0	0	1	2	5	9	2
Atlanta	0	1	0	1	2	0	0	0	0	4	5	1
WP: Duane Ward (1–0) LP: Jeff Reardon (0–1) Sv: Tom Henke (1); Home runs: TOR: Ed Sprague Jr. (1); ATL: None

Before the game started, during the performance of the National Anthems of the United States and Canada, the U.S. Marine Corps Color Guard accidentally flew the flag of Canada upside down The Corps apologized for the error and took pains to carry the flag properly prior to Game 3 in Toronto after insisting that they would be honored to do so. Also, Canadian rock/country musician Tom Cochrane sang the Canadian national anthem incorrectly. Instead of singing the line "... from far and wide, O Canada, we stand on guard for thee ...", Cochrane instead sang a lyric that was in the previous version of the anthem: "... O Canada, we stand on guard, we stand on guard for thee ...". Not only did Cochrane substitute the archaic lyric, he also did not sing it correctly, as the lyric said "and stand on guard, O Canada, we stand on guard for thee" before it was changed. Peabo Bryson sang the American national anthem.

The pitching match-up featured, strangely, the two leading strikeout pitchers in the National League in 1992. On August 27, 1992, the Blue Jays traded rookie infielder Jeff Kent and minor league outfield prospect Ryan Thompson to the New York Mets for ace starting pitcher, David Cone. At the time of the trade, Cone had been leading the National League in strikeouts and was looking to do so for a third consecutive season. Major League Baseball rules dictate that when a player changes leagues during a season, the statistics he earns in each league are kept separate from each other. As such, Cone's total of 214 strikeouts with the Mets was frozen. Smoltz eventually caught and passed Cone in his last start of the season on October 2, finishing with 215 strikeouts to lead the league. Cone, meanwhile, settled for the overall major league lead, with a career high 261 strikeouts.

Both pitchers had some success thus far in the postseason. Smoltz started three games in the NLCS, winning two and being saved from a loss when the Braves made a two-out rally in the decisive final game; his performance was enough to make him the series MVP. Cone started the second and fifth games of the ALCS, winning his first start by allowing one run over eight innings. His second start saw him give up six runs, three of them unearned, over four innings, saddling him with the loss.

A controversial call was made by umpire Mike Reilly in the top of the fourth inning with Atlanta leading 1–0 after David Justice walked, stole second, advanced to third on Manuel Lee's error on Jeff Blauser's ground ball, and scored on a wild pitch from Cone in the bottom of the second. Roberto Alomar was at third base with John Olerud batting. Smoltz threw a breaking ball that skipped past Damon Berryhill. Alomar broke for home plate while Berryhill went to retrieve the ball. As Smoltz moved in to receive the throw he nearly collided with a sliding Alomar, who had reached the plate at exactly the same time that both Smoltz and the ball did. Smoltz tagged Alomar and Reilly called him out on the close play, despite an angry Alomar's protest, and the inning came to an end. Replays shown by CBS showed that Alomar likely touched the plate with his hands before Smoltz was able to apply a tag. The Braves scored again in the bottom of the fourth, when Sid Bream walked and eventually scored on a Mark Lemke two-out single to make the score 2–0.

In the top of the fifth Pat Borders and Manuel Lee both reached base in front of Cone, who had already singled earlier in the game. Cone responded with his second hit of the game to drive in Borders and cut the Atlanta lead to 2–1. Cone was only the second AL pitcher to get a hit in the World Series since 1980. Lee then scored on a single by Devon White, tying the game. The Braves rallied in the bottom half of the inning, with Deion Sanders providing a spark. With one out, Sanders singled. He then immediately stole second, and after Borders made an errant throw he got up and ran to third. Cone then walked Terry Pendleton, then gave up the go-ahead run when David Justice singled in Sanders and moved Pendleton to third. Blue Jays manager Cito Gaston then pulled Cone in favor of David Wells, who gave up the fourth Atlanta run, all charged to Cone, on pinch hitter Brian Hunter's sacrifice fly scored Pendleton.

Toronto made another rally in the eighth inning. After Alomar doubled to left with one out, Joe Carter and Dave Winfield hit back to back singles, the second of which scored Alomar and cut the lead to 4–3. Smoltz was then replaced by left-handed specialist Mike Stanton, who retired Olerud for the second out.

With third baseman Kelly Gruber stepping to the plate, the Braves called upon their own August trade acquisition to pitch, former Boston Red Sox closer and the then-holder of baseball's all-time career saves record Jeff Reardon. He managed to strike Gruber out, preserving Atlanta's lead, which did not change as setup man Duane Ward set them down in order in the bottom of the eighth.

The Jays entered the ninth trailing by one run and turned to their bench, which the team had nicknamed "The Trenches." After a walk to pinch-hitter Derek Bell (batting for Lee), Toronto reserve infielder Ed Sprague Jr. pinch-hit for Ward and drilled a pitch from Reardon to left for a two-run homer to give the Blue Jays the lead. The play was called by legendary Blue Jays announcer Tom Cheek, who said "Watch him hit a homer" during Sprague's at bat.

Atlanta tried to rally in the ninth. After Mark Lemke flew out, pinch hitter Lonnie Smith was hit by a pitch from Toronto closer Tom Henke. Ron Gant came in to pinch run for Smith. After Otis Nixon recorded the second out, Gant stole second. Sanders then walked to put the winning run on base as Pendleton, an NL MVP candidate, came to the plate. Pendleton had led the majors with a .391 average with runners in scoring position in the regular season. However, he hit a foul infield pop up to Gruber to seal the victory for Toronto. After the catch, Gruber did a short, mocking Tomahawk Chop, which upset Atlanta fans.

=== Game 3 ===
Tuesday, October 20, 1992 8:29 pm (EDT) at SkyDome in Toronto, Ontario 73 °F (23 °C), dome
Team	1	2	3	4	5	6	7	8	9	R	H	E
Atlanta	0	0	0	0	0	1	0	1	0	2	9	0
Toronto	0	0	0	1	0	0	0	1	1	3	6	1
WP: Duane Ward (2–0) LP: Steve Avery (0–1); Home runs: ATL: None; TOR: Joe Carter (2), Kelly Gruber (1)

Before this game, the U.S. Marine Corps Color Guard offered to hoist the Canadian flag once more in order to make amends for the inverted flag incident of Game 2. Likewise, the Royal Canadian Mounted Police flew the United States flag. The two guards received a standing ovation from the Toronto fans. Anne Murray sang the Canadian national anthem, and Jon Secada sang the American national anthem.

As Game 3 moved across the border for the first Fall Classic game in Canada, the question still remained of the Blue Jays' homefield advantage. The Blue Jays had a 3–6 postseason record at the SkyDome, losing 6 consecutive games from the 1989 ALCS to Game 1 of the 1992 ALCS. However, they had a two-game home win streak, beating the Athletics in Game 2 and the clinching Game 6 of the 1992 ALCS.

The Game 3 starters were Steve Avery for the Braves and Juan Guzmán for the Blue Jays. The left-handed Avery was a workhorse, throwing a career high 233 2/3 innings in the regular season and 8 innings in three NCLS appearances, though his results were worse than the previous season, when he received Cy Young Award votes, and the following season, when he was an All-Star. Guzmán was coming off his only All-Star Game appearance and led the Blue Jays with 165 strikeouts. He was the winning pitcher in Games 3 and 6 of the ALCS.

In the fourth inning, the first big defensive play of the Series nearly resulted in a triple play. Deion Sanders and Terry Pendleton reached base to start the inning. With no outs, David Justice hit a deep fly headed toward the center field wall. Devon White chased down the ball, leaping to snare it before crashing into the wall. On the basepaths, Sanders and Pendleton waited to see if White would catch the ball; once he did, Pendleton inadvertently ran a few steps past Sanders and was called out. The relay came in to first baseman John Olerud, who then threw across the diamond to third baseman Kelly Gruber as Sanders was caught between bases. Gruber ran Sanders back toward second, then lunged to tag him as Sanders tried to slide back into second. Second base umpire Bob Davidson called Sanders safe, but Gruber protested that he had tagged Sanders on his foot before he got back and television replays confirmed the call had been missed. The Braves would not score that inning, as Guzman struck out the next batter, Lonnie Smith, to end the threat.

With one out in the bottom of the fourth, Joe Carter hit a home run off of Avery. Carter's second blast past the left field wall of the series was the first World Series run scored outside the United States as well as the first World Series home run hit in Canada.

The Blue Jays still led 1–0 when the Braves mounted a rally in the top of the sixth inning. With one out, Sanders doubled off of Guzman. Pendleton singled to advance Sanders to third, and Justice then added his own single to score Sanders, tying the game. Guzman recovered, retiring Smith and Sid Bream to leave Pendleton, the go-ahead run, stranded at second.

The Braves took the lead in the eighth. Otis Nixon led off with a line drive to the left side. The ball hit Gruber's glove, and the Braves had the go-ahead run on base due to an error. Nixon stole second, putting himself in scoring position with nobody out. Guzman retired Sanders and Pendleton, but Nixon advanced to third on the latter's groundout. Blue Jays manager Cito Gaston intentionally walked Justice to pitch to Smith. The move backfired, as Smith singled to score Nixon and give Atlanta a 2–1 lead. On the play, Justice was thrown out trying to advance to third by Candy Maldonado, who initially bobbled the ball.

In the bottom of the eighth, Gruber had the chance to make up for his fielding error and snap a long hitless streak. After going hitless in the ALCS opener, Gruber hit a home run and a double in the second game, both of which led to decisive runs in that game. Those had been the only two hits he had recorded to that point in the postseason, as he failed to record a hit in the subsequent four ALCS games or the first two games in the World Series, going 0-for-1 with a walk so far in Game 3. After going 0-for-23, Gruber worked a full count on Avery and then drilled a home run to left field to tie the game. Gruber only had one more hit in the rest of the series.

Duane Ward replaced Guzman for the top of the ninth and gave up a single to Bream. The sequence of events that followed resulted in something that had not occurred in the World Series in seven years. Bream was a notoriously slow baserunner, and Braves manager Bobby Cox often replaced him with a pinch runner late in games. Cox put in Brian Hunter to run. Ward then faced shortstop Jeff Blauser. On a 2–2 count, Cox called for a hit-and-run. Blauser tried to check his swing as Blue Jays catcher Pat Borders threw down to second, where Manuel Lee tagged out Hunter. Lee then pointed to first base to get Borders to check for an appeal on Blauser's check swing. Umpire Dan Morrison ruled that Blauser swung at the pitch, resulting in a strikeout.

Seconds later, home plate umpire Joe West noticed that a batting helmet had made its way onto the field from inside the Atlanta dugout. Out of frustration over West's pitch calls, Cox had picked up the helmet and slammed it on concrete floor of the dugout, from where it bounced onto the field; Cox came out and argued with West for more than a minute before he was eventually ejected. The next day, Cox complained about other balls and strikes calls during Game 2. The last time a manager was ejected from a World Series game was Whitey Herzog in 1985. Smith emerged from the dugout to argue as well, believing that he had also been ejected, but he remained in the game.

Avery gave up a single to Roberto Alomar to lead off the bottom of the ninth. Acting manager Jimy Williams, Atlanta's third base coach, pulled Avery from the game and brought in hard-throwing Mark Wohlers to face Carter. CBS announcer Tim McCarver questioned the strategy, because Alomar was a threat to steal a base and the left-handed Avery had a quicker pickoff move than the right-handed Wohlers. On a 2–0 pitch, Alomar stole second. Wohler's pitch was a ball. Down 3–0, the Braves intentionally walked Carter. The cleanup hitter Dave Winfield was the next batter, but Gaston did not let him swing away. Winfield dropped down a sacrifice bunt, advancing the winning run to third with one out.

Olerud, a left-handed batter, was due up next, so Williams replaced Wohlers with Mike Stanton, his left-handed specialist, to face the Blue Jays’ first baseman. Gaston responded by calling on right-handed Ed Sprague Jr., who had a pinch-hit home run in Game 2, to pinch hit to give the Blue Jays a platoon advantage. The Braves responded by intentionally walking Sprague, loading the bases. Closer Jeff Reardon came in to face Maldonado.

Reardon had handled Maldonado well in the past, allowing only two hits, both doubles, in 14 plate appearances. Maldonado whiffed at two straight breaking balls. On Reardon's third offspeed pitch, Maldonado drove the ball over a drawn-in outfield to bring home Alomar with the winning run, giving the Blue Jays the lead in the series. Like Gruber after Game 2, Alomar celebrated with a mocking Tomahawk Chop as he trotted to home plate.

Ward earned his second win of the series. Avery took the loss, as he was responsible for Alomar reaching in the ninth. Reardon did not pitch again in the series after his back to back poor performances. He did not pitch in a postseason game again, retiring in 1994. While Williams was the acting manager in the bottom of the ninth inning, Cox admitted after the game that he called for all of Atlanta's pitching changes from just beyond the team's dugout.

=== Game 4 ===
Wednesday, October 21, 1992 8:29 pm (EDT) at SkyDome in Toronto, Ontario 73 °F (23 °C), dome
Team	1	2	3	4	5	6	7	8	9	R	H	E
Atlanta	0	0	0	0	0	0	0	1	0	1	5	0
Toronto	0	0	1	0	0	0	1	0	X	2	6	0
WP: Jimmy Key (1–0) LP: Tom Glavine (1–1) Sv: Tom Henke (2); Home runs: ATL: None; TOR: Pat Borders (1)

The Braves continued to employ the short rotation they had used during the postseason and sent Tom Glavine, the Game 1 winner, out for his second start of the series, bypassing 15-game-winner Charlie Leibrandt, who had only seen mop-up duty for Atlanta in Games 5 and 6 of the NLCS. For the Blue Jays, veteran Jimmy Key was given the start. Key had been with the Blue Jays since 1984 and was one of several players from their first ever division champion squad that were still with the team. However, he had not performed particularly well during the season and Cito Gaston had not included him in the ALCS rotation; Key only pitched in Toronto's Game 5 loss in relief.

The Braves began the game with a single off the bat of Otis Nixon, who was a threat to steal a base. Although Key managed to pick Nixon off of first, he immediately gave up a single to Jeff Blauser, hitting second in place of the resting Deion Sanders, and allowed him to steal second. Key neutralized the threat by forcing Terry Pendleton to line out and Lonnie Smith to ground out. Over the next six innings, the Braves only recorded one hit (another single by Nixon) and did not advance the runner past first base.

In the third inning, the Blue Jays scored their first run when Pat Borders hit a home run. They added a second run in the bottom of the seventh, which would prove decisive, when Kelly Gruber scored on a single by Devon White with two out.

The Braves broke through against Key in the eighth. Ron Gant, starting in place of Sanders, led off with a double. Brian Hunter, starting at first base in place of Sid Bream, followed by beating out a bunt down the third base line to put runners on the corners with nobody out. Key recorded back-to-back outs, retiring Damon Berryhill on a failed sacrifice bunt attempt that didn't advance the runners and getting Mark Lemke to ground out to third. On the Lemke play, Gant scored the Braves' first run of the game and with the tying run now in scoring position as Hunter advanced to second on the groundout, Key was removed from the game. On his way off the field, he tipped his cap to the fans as they gave him a standing ovation.

Duane Ward was brought in for his third consecutive appearance and his first batter was Nixon, who had recorded two of the Braves' hits. Although Ward got Nixon to strike out swinging, the third strike got past Borders and Nixon took off for first base, and being a speedy runner he was able to reach first safely, ahead of the throw. Nixon then stole second to put the go-ahead runs in scoring position, with Hunter having advanced to third on the wild pitch. Blauser, however, ended the inning by grounding out to Olerud. Tom Henke closed the game for the Blue Jays by retiring Pendleton, Smith, and David Justice in order in the ninth and Toronto found itself a win away from becoming the first World Series championship team from outside the United States. Tom Glavine would pitch another solid complete game, but his bad luck in the postseason continued and he was charged with a loss—the third time he had lost a post-season game despite turning in a very solid outing, previously losing a 1–0 game to Pittsburgh and a 3–2 game to Minnesota (in which two of the three runs were unearned) along with the 2–1 loss in this game. He would later add another hard-luck World Series loss four years later despite another stellar outing giving up one earned run and four hits in seven innings.

In what proved to be his last start for the Blue Jays after nine years, Key recorded his first victory in the postseason since he won Game 3 of the 1989 ALCS.

=== Game 5 ===
Thursday, October 22, 1992 8:29 pm (EDT) at SkyDome in Toronto, Ontario 73 °F (23 °C), dome
Team	1	2	3	4	5	6	7	8	9	R	H	E
Atlanta	1	0	0	1	5	0	0	0	0	7	13	0
Toronto	0	1	0	1	0	0	0	0	0	2	6	0
WP: John Smoltz (1–0) LP: Jack Morris (0–2) Sv: Mike Stanton (1); Home runs: ATL: David Justice (1), Lonnie Smith (1); TOR: None

Down three games to one and facing elimination, the Braves returned John Smoltz to the mound for Game 5, who was still seeking his first World Series win after three previous solid starts all resulted in no decisions. Toronto countered by returning Jack Morris as starter, as he looked to atone for his postseason struggles and, for a second consecutive year, win the deciding game of the World Series.

Although Atlanta's situation was dire, it was not impossible for them to come back as several teams in the past had done so. The most recent example had been in 1985, when the Kansas City Royals rallied from a 3–1 deficit to defeat the St. Louis Cardinals in seven games. In fact, Braves third baseman Terry Pendleton had been a member of that Cardinals team and met with his teammates before the game to remind them of the possibility that they might come back and win the series.

Entering the night, the middle of the Braves' lineup, which consisted that evening of Pendleton hitting third, David Justice fourth, and Lonnie Smith fifth, had been struggling with the rest of the team when it came to producing hits and scoring runs. In fact, none of the batters hitting in those three slots (Pendleton, Justice, Smith, or Sid Bream who had hit fifth in the first two games in Atlanta) had recorded an extra base hit. The Braves took care of that statistic quickly.

Otis Nixon led the game off for the Braves with a ground rule double due to fan interference. After Deion Sanders struck out, Nixon stole third as Pendleton batted. He then scored as Pendleton responded with a double of his own to right field, scoring the first run of the game and giving Justice a chance to drive in a runner in scoring position. Morris settled down, however, and retired Justice on a strikeout and Smith on a flyball to end the inning.

The Blue Jays tied the game in the bottom of the second. With one out, John Olerud singled and Candy Maldonado reached on a walk. Smoltz struck out Kelly Gruber for the second out, but Pat Borders responded with a double. The slow-footed Olerud was sent home on the play and the throw to the plate was wide, which enabled him to score and put Maldonado on third with the lead run. Manuel Lee ended the threat, however, by lining out to Pendleton.

The fourth inning saw the teams exchange runs again. In the visiting half, Justice led off with a home run for a 2–1 lead. Morris quickly retired Smith and Sid Bream, however, and Borders threw Jeff Blauser out stealing to keep the deficit at one. In the bottom half, Olerud and Maldonado reached base in front of Borders with one out, and as he had in the second inning he drove in Olerud with a single. But once again, the Blue Jays could not score the lead run as Lee grounded into a fielder's choice which forced Maldonado out at third and Smoltz struck Devon White out with Borders at second.

Morris started the fifth inning by striking out Damon Berryhill, whose home run in Game 1 saddled him with the loss, and forcing Mark Lemke to ground out. Nixon followed with a single, after which he stole second base. Sanders singled to drive him in and give the Braves the lead, and Pendleton followed with another ground rule double due to fan interference. The call prevented Sanders from scoring on the play, as he was forced to stop at third, and brought Justice back to the plate having already homered an inning earlier.

Blue Jays manager Cito Gaston, with his ace struggling to record the third out and with one of the Braves' biggest bats at the plate with a chance to break the game open, decided to go with the same strategy he had when facing Justice with two out in the eighth inning of game three and called for an intentional walk. This brought Smith to the plate, who later said he took the move as an insult and felt that, by opting to pitch to him instead of Justice, that he would be an "easy out". Indeed, Smith had been struggling in the series to this point; entering Game 5, he had only recorded one hit and was already 0 for 2 this night. His lone hit, however, had come in the aforementioned Game 3 and resulted in an RBI which gave the Braves the lead.

Smith fouled the first pitch off, then took a ball to even the count. Morris got Smith to foul off the next pitch, leaving him one strike away from escaping the jam and leaving the Braves with the bases loaded. Smith, however, was determined to make the Blue Jays pay for disrespecting his ability and after he fouled off two more pitches, he deposited Morris' sixth pitch over the wall and into the Atlanta bullpen. The grand slam home run gave the Braves a five-run lead and Gaston finally removed his starter from the game. David Wells retired Bream to end the inning, with the Blue Jays trailing 7–2.

Smoltz pitched into the seventh inning giving up one hit afterward, a single to Dave Winfield in the bottom of the fifth. After walking Lee to lead off the seventh, he was pulled in favor of Mike Stanton, who got White to ground into a fielder's choice and then induced a double play from Roberto Alomar to end the threat. The Blue Jays only received one more baserunner the rest of the night as Joe Carter singled, stole second, then advanced to third on a sacrifice fly by Ed Sprague Jr. in the eighth inning but got nothing additional.

Meanwhile, the Toronto relief corps of Wells, Mike Timlin, and Mark Eichhorn managed to keep the Braves in check for the remainder of the game. Atlanta threatened one more time in the ninth with one out as Lemke, Nixon, and Sanders all reached base, but Todd Stottlemyre induced a fly ball out to Maldonado off the bat of Pendleton and Lemke was thrown out trying to score.

Smoltz took the win, his first ever World Series victory, with Stanton getting the save and Morris taking his second loss. Morris would not pitch another postseason game after this, with Smith being the last batter he would face in the postseason. With Smoltz and Morris earning the decisions, this was, to date, the last World Series game in which both the winning and losing pitcher were later inducted into the Hall of Fame until Game 7 of the 2001 World Series (Randy Johnson and Mariano Rivera were the pitchers of record).

Atlanta's offensive outburst ensured the series would return to the United States for at least one more game and dashed the Blue Jays' hopes of clinching the World Series at home on Canadian soil. The Braves would return home looking to force a second straight Game 7 of the World Series, and potentially supplant the 1985 Kansas City Royals as the most recent team to come back from 3–1 down to win the World Series.

Smoltz's win in Game 5 was the first of only two World Series wins he recorded in his Hall of Fame career. After recording three no decisions in as many starts (Games 4 and 7 in 1991 and Game 2 in this series), Smoltz would go another four years before winning another World Series game before winning Game 1 of the 1996 World Series. His overall record in World Series play was 2-2, despite a track record of seven quality starts out of eight. He lost Game 5 in 1996, 1-0 (the one run was unearned) and Game 4 in 1999. Smoltz's only other World Series start was in the 1995 World Series and this was his only poor start in a World Series, but this one also resulted in a no decision in Game 3 after the Braves rallied to force extra innings.

Morris, meanwhile, continued his struggles in the 1992 postseason. In four total appearances, Morris allowed a total of 19 runs and went 0–3 with an ERA above 7.00. In the World Series alone, his ERA was 8.44, over seven runs higher than his performance the year before when he recorded a 1.17 ERA. Game 5 would be his last postseason appearance for his career; Morris was injured toward the end of the following season and did not pitch in the postseason. He would retire from baseball in 1995.

Smith's grand slam was the first in a World Series since 1988, when Jose Canseco hit one in the Oakland Athletics' eventual 5–4 loss to the Los Angeles Dodgers. Smith became the first player to hit one for the winning team since Kent Hrbek did so in Game 6 of the 1987 World Series for the Minnesota Twins, and was the last for a player on the visiting team until Addison Russell did so in Game 6 of the 2016 World Series for the Chicago Cubs.

=== Game 6 ===
Saturday, October 24, 1992 8:29 pm (EDT) at Atlanta–Fulton County Stadium in Atlanta, Georgia 66 °F (19 °C), clear
Team	1	2	3	4	5	6	7	8	9	10	11	R	H	E
Toronto	1	0	0	1	0	0	0	0	0	0	2	4	14	1
Atlanta	0	0	1	0	0	0	0	0	1	0	1	3	8	1
WP: Jimmy Key (2–0) LP: Charlie Leibrandt (0–1) Sv: Mike Timlin (1); Home runs: TOR: Candy Maldonado (1); ATL: None

Having staved off elimination for at least one more game, the Braves returned home for Game 6 once again needing a win to stay alive. They gave the ball to Steve Avery, who took the loss in Game 3 since he had been responsible for the winning run (Roberto Alomar) being on base.

David Cone started for the Blue Jays, looking to bounce back from his struggles in Game 2. He was pulled in the fifth inning after allowing all four of the runs scored by the Braves that night, but ended with a no decision after Ed Sprague's ninth inning home run won the game for Toronto.

Both pitchers were still looking for their first win in a World Series. Avery was 0–1 in three starts entering Game 6, with his only decision coming in the Game 3 defeat in Toronto. Cone had not pitched in the World Series prior to being traded by the Mets during this season, with his no decision in Game 2 being his first appearance.

As he had done in Games 1 and 2, Toronto manager Cito Gaston played Dave Winfield in the field in order to keep his bat on the lineup; National League rules at the time did not allow the use of a designated hitter. With Winfield playing right field, Joe Carter was moved to first base and John Olerud was taken out of the lineup.

The Blue Jays opened the scoring in the top of the first. Devon White led off with a single, then stole second base. He advanced to third on a groundout by Alomar, and Carter followed with a fly ball to right that David Justice could not field cleanly. White scored and Carter ended up on second. Avery then walked Winfield and got Candy Maldonado to hit a ground ball to the left side. The Braves only managed to get Winfield out, as Carter advanced to third. A Kelly Gruber groundout ended the inning, stranding Carter ninety feet from home.

The first scoring chance for the Braves came in the second. After Sid Bream drew a walk to lead off the inning, Jeff Blauser followed with a single. Damon Berryhill then flew out to White, with the fly ball deep enough to allow the slow-footed Bream to reach third. Cone retired Mark Lemke on a fly out, then struck out Avery to end the threat and keep the Braves off the scoreboard.

In the third, the Blue Jays again had a chance to score but did not take advantage. With one out, Alomar singled and stole second. Carter grounded out to Bream, which advanced Alomar to third. But as in the first, Avery got out of trouble as Winfield flew out to end the inning. In the home half of the inning, Atlanta managed to tie the game. A one out double by Deion Sanders was followed by him stealing third, and Terry Pendleton scored Sanders on a sacrifice fly to tie the score.

Toronto went back to work in the fourth. Maldonado led off with a home run, and with one out Pat Borders doubled. After Avery struck out Manuel Lee, he walked Cone to keep the inning going. White followed with a single and Borders attempted to score from second. The throw from Sanders beat him to the plate, however, and the Blue Jays only managed the one run. Avery left the game after the inning.

After the Braves went down in order in the bottom of the fourth, the Blue Jays had another chance to add to the lead as Carter doubled off of Pete Smith in the top of the fifth. Again, they left him in scoring position as Smith got Winfield and Maldonado out. The Braves tried to rally against Cone in the last half of the inning, with Lemke drawing a walk to start. Cone got the next two outs, but Sanders singled and stole second to put the go-ahead run in scoring position. Pendleton, however, struck out to end the frame.

After neither team got a runner past first base in the sixth or seventh innings, the Blue Jays tried again to score an insurance run in the eighth. Mike Stanton gave up a single to Maldonado, who advanced on a sacrifice bunt by Gruber. Borders was then walked intentionally, and Lee popped out for the second out. Stanton then got pinch hitter Derek Bell to ground out, leaving the Blue Jays with another runner stranded in scoring position. Stanton came back out for the ninth, but after he gave up a double to Carter, Mark Wohlers entered the game and retired Winfield. The Braves bullpen had pitched five scoreless innings to keep the score at 2-1 entering the bottom of the ninth, where they would need to score at least one run to keep their season alive; they would have to do this, once again, against Blue Jays closer Tom Henke.

Entering the game, the Blue Jays bullpen had not allowed a run all series against the Braves, with the streak continuing with two combined innings of work by Todd Stottlemyre and David Wells. Henke had already converted two save opportunities, saving Game 2 for Duane Ward and Game 4 for Jimmy Key. The Toronto bullpen had also converted every save opportunity it had been presented with, with their last blown save coming in the previous year's ALCS when Mike Timlin failed to hold a 5–4 lead in the Blue Jays' Game 5 loss to the eventual World Series champion Minnesota Twins that ended their season. Henke had already saved a total of five games across both the World Series and ALCS.

Blauser, Berryhill, and Lemke were due up, with the pitcher's spot fourth if anyone reached base. Henke gave up a single to lead off the inning. After Berryhill laid down a sacrifice bunt to advance Blauser into scoring position, Lonnie Smith, whose heroics in Game 5 brought the Braves back to Atlanta, was sent up to pinch hit for Lemke. After falling behind 0-2, Smith fought back to draw a walk and put the potential game winning run on base with one out.

With the pitcher's spot now due, Cox decided to call on another one of his postseason heroes to pinch hit for Wohlers. After recording the game and series winning hit against the Pirates in the NLCS, Francisco Cabrera had yet to make an appearance in the World Series before Cox sent him up to pinch hit. On a 2-2 count, Cabrera hit a sharp liner to left field to Maldonado. However, Maldonado temporarily lost sight of the ball and he had to leap to catch it at the last second.

Otis Nixon then stepped to the plate with the Braves one out away from a second consecutive World Series defeat, needing a hit to extend the game. Down to his final strike, Nixon lined a single to left field. Maldonado fielded the ball as Blauser rounded third, but made a wild throw that sailed over Borders and into the netting behind the backstop. Blauser scored and Smith and Nixon advanced a base on the error. Ron Gant, who had replaced Sanders earlier when he left the game due to an injury, came up with a chance to win the game with a hit, but Henke retired him on a fly ball to end the inning and keep the score tied.

The Braves sent out Charlie Leibrandt to make his first appearance of the World Series against the middle of the Blue Jays' lineup in the top of the tenth. He retired Maldonado to start the inning, and then after he gave up a single to Gruber he set down Borders on a fly ball and Pat Tabler on a line drive back to the mound. Henke took the mound to face Pendleton and retired him on a groundout to start the Braves' half of the tenth. With two left-handed batters due up in Justice and Bream, Gaston brought in the veteran Key to make his second appearance of the series; he retired both men to keep the game tied.

The Braves began the eleventh with action in their bullpen. Leibrandt, a left-hander, would be facing Key and two switch-hitters in White and Alomar, but if the inning was to extend beyond them, matchups with the power hitting Carter and struggling Winfield, both righties, loomed. Jeff Reardon began warming up, with the idea that he would face Carter and/or Winfield should the inning be extended.

After retiring Key to start the inning, Leibrandt got ahead of White 1-2. However, the next pitch struck White, and Alomar followed with a single to move him into scoring position. With Carter now the batter, the lead run at second base, and Reardon having been warmed up for some time, CBS analyst Tim McCarver remarked on the broadcast that he believed Cox would come out to remove the veteran starter. However, Reardon had struggled in both of his previous outings in the series, blowing the save in the Game 2 loss and allowing the winning run in Game 3 and had not been called on to pitch since. Whatever his reasoning was, Cox stayed in the dugout and allowed Leibrandt to face Carter, retiring him on a flyout.

Winfield, to this point hitless in four at bats, was the next batter. He had not hit well in the series to this point, and had also struggled in his only other appearance in the World Series, hitting just .045 for the Yankees in 1981. However, he had faced Leibrandt many times when he pitched for the Kansas City Royals in the 1980s and had recorded a .302 batting average against him with four home runs. On the sixth pitch of the at-bat, Winfield hit a line drive that dropped into left field. White scored from second, and Alomar followed closely behind as the ball took a strange hop off of the left field corner and Gant could not field it cleanly. It was Winfield's first career World Series extra-base hit and made the score 4-2. The Braves got out of the inning with no further damage though as Maldonado popped out.

For the second consecutive year in the World Series, Leibrandt had given up a go-ahead extra base hit in extra innings in Game 6. In 1991, he had allowed the game-winning home run to Kirby Puckett in the eleventh inning that allowed the Twins to tie the series and force the deciding seventh game that they would eventually win.

Unlike that situation, the Braves would get one more at bat to try and rally. And as they had in the bottom of the ninth inning of this game, the bottom third of the Atlanta batting order would be due up. Their bench, however, was running thin as was their pool of available pitchers. The only two position players left were Javy Lopez, a backup catcher, and Brian Hunter, who played mostly first base.

Blauser led off the bottom of the eleventh by singling off of Key. On the very next pitch, Key got Berryhill to hit what should have been a double play ball toward veteran shortstop Alfredo Griffin, who had entered the game as a defensive replacement in the tenth. At the last moment, however, the ball took a strange hop and bounced off of Griffin's glove, which allowed Blauser to advance to third base and putting the tying run on first with nobody out. Cox then called for a pinch runner, but with a relatively thin bench left at his disposal he sent out Game 5 winning pitcher John Smoltz to take Berryhill's position. The next batter was Rafael Belliard, who had replaced Lemke at second base in the tenth inning and who also had yet to record a hit in the series to this point. Cox called for a sacrifice bunt to move Smoltz into scoring position, which he did successfully.

With the pitcher's spot up next, Cox sent pinch hitter Brian Hunter up to try and drive the runners home with a hit. On the second pitch of the at-bat, Hunter hit the ball to the right side of the infield, which Carter fielded and stepped on the bag for the putout. The runners advanced, with Blauser scoring, but the Braves were still behind by one run and were once again down to their last out. With Nixon, who had driven in the tying run in the ninth after being down to his final strike, stepping up with another chance to tie the game, Gaston visited the mound to have a conference with his infielders.

During the course of the meeting at the mound, Gaston decided to pull Key from the game and hand the ball to the right-handed Timlin, who had thrown one scoreless inning in the Blue Jays’ Game 5 loss. The possibility of Nixon trying to beat out a bunt for a base hit was also discussed, and Timlin was advised by Carter to “be careful” and watch for the bunt. With Timlin coming in, the switch-hitting Nixon would be forced to bat left-handed. Although he had a higher average from the right side of the plate, the left side was closer to the first base line and would allow Nixon to get a quicker start if he decided to try to beat out a bunt.

On the second pitch of the at-bat, Nixon laid down the expected bunt. The ball rolled to Timlin, who fielded it cleanly and fired it to first base in plenty of time to retire Nixon and clinch the series for the Blue Jays. After the final out was recorded, Timlin asked Carter for the ball so he could commemorate his title winning save. Carter obliged, and gave his pitcher a hug in celebration. Key received his second win of the series, making him and Ward the only two Blue Jay pitchers to record victories during the series (the only other pitcher of record was Jack Morris, who went 0–2 in his two starts). Leibrandt took the loss, his third in as many appearances for the Braves in a World Series.

== Composite box ==
1992 World Series (4–2): Toronto Blue Jays (A.L.) over Atlanta Braves (N.L.)

Team	1	2	3	4	5	6	7	8	9	10	11	R	H	E
Toronto Blue Jays	1	1	1	4	2	0	1	2	3	0	2	17	45	4
Atlanta Braves	1	1	1	2	7	4	0	2	1	0	1	20	44	2
Total attendance: 311,460 Average attendance: 51,910; Winning player's share: $144,962 Losing player's share: $84,259

This World Series is notable for being one of the few six-game series in which the winning team was outscored. It happened previously in 1918, 1959, and 1977; later in 1996 and 2003. Seven-game winners were outscored in 1957, 1960, 1962, 1964, 1971, 1972, 1973, 1975, 1991, 1997, 2002, and 2025; (equaled in 2016 and 2017).

The Blue Jays became the fourth World Series champion where each of their wins in the Series was by the margin of one run. This also happened in 1915, 1918 and 1972.

== Series overview and aftermath ==
Game 6 would be both last games for both pitchers of record with their respective teams. Jimmy Key joined the New York Yankees for 1993 and would eventually return to the World Series with them against the Braves in 1996, pitching in two games and, as he had in this series, winning the clinching Game 6. He would retire in 1998 after two seasons with the Baltimore Orioles. Charlie Leibrandt would pitch one more season with the Texas Rangers in 1993, retiring following a 9–10 campaign and a torn rotator cuff.

David Cone, the starter for the decisive Game 6, would also leave Toronto to join the Kansas City Royals for 1993; he would eventually return to the Blue Jays in a trade in 1995, then be traded to the Yankees that same year. Like Key, he was on the 1996 team that defeated the Braves in the World Series, having started and won Game 3; Cone would win three more World Series in his career afterward.

Although Mike Timlin pitched in the majors for another sixteen seasons after this, his save in Game 6 was his only career postseason save. He would win three more World Series as a player, one more with the Blue Jays and two with the Boston Red Sox before retiring after the 2008 season.

With the series win, Gaston became the first African American manager in baseball history to win a World Series until Dave Roberts won the 2020 World Series with the Los Angeles Dodgers. Dusty Baker joined the club two years later with the Houston Astros.

American League president Dr. Bobby Brown presented the World Series Trophy in the place of the commissioner. Just a month earlier, Fay Vincent was forced to resign and was replaced by Bud Selig on what was originally perceived to be an "interim basis." Dr. Brown also presented the Blue Jays the trophy in 1993. The last World Series not to be presided over by a commissioner had taken place in 1919. Selig officially became commissioner of baseball in 1998.

In the 1992–1993 off-season, the Braves signed ace starting pitcher Greg Maddux, forming an All-Star rotation that already featured John Smoltz, Tom Glavine and Steve Avery.

The victory marked the first major championship for the city of Toronto since the National Hockey League's Toronto Maple Leafs won the 1967 Stanley Cup Finals.

On January 29, 1995, Deion Sanders while a member of the National Football League's San Francisco 49ers participated in Super Bowl XXIX, thus Sanders became the first and to date, only professional athlete to play in both a World Series and Super Bowl.

1995, the Braves would win their first World Series in the city of Atlanta, defeating the Cleveland Indians in six games.

== Broadcasting ==
At 30 years of age, CBS' Sean McDonough became the youngest man to call all nine innings and games of a World Series while serving as a network television employee. Although Vin Scully and Al Michaels were several years younger when they called their first World Series in 1955 and 1972 respectively, they were products of the broadcasting practice of announcers representing the participating teams calling games, a practice that ended following the 1976 World Series. McDonough's record would subsequently be broken by Fox's Joe Buck, who at 27 years of age, called the 1996 World Series. Coincidentally, McDonough replaced Buck's father, Jack Buck, as CBS's lead play-by-play man. Serving as field reporters for CBS's coverage were Jim Kaat (in the Braves' dugout) and Lesley Visser (in the Blue Jays' dugout). The Series drew an overall Nielsen rating of 20.2, down from the previous year's 24.0 but higher than that of any subsequent World Series.

The CBS broadcast was simulcast in Canada by CTV, as MLB rules at the time did not allow for a dedicated Canadian telecast; CTV executives acknowledged that a single telecast ensured more viewers for its advertisers due to simultaneous substitution rules, which required cable providers to substitute feeds of CBS affiliates with those of CTV stations during the broadcasts. Canadian viewers accused CBS of displaying a bias against the Blue Jays in its coverage and commentary; of particular criticism was a pregame segment presented by CBS News Sunday Morning correspondent Bill Geist, which jokingly wondered if Canadians played baseball with hockey sticks and pucks, and ifFrench was the sole official language of the country. CTV's headquarters received over 250 complaints about the segment, while network affiliates also received numerous complaints, according to a CTV executive who himself criticized the piece and said he would be raising the matter with CBS.

CBS Radio also broadcast the Series nationally, with Vin Scully and Johnny Bench announcing. Locally, the Series was called on WGST-AM in Atlanta by Skip Caray, Pete Van Wieren, Ernie Johnson, Joe Simpson, and Don Sutton, and on CJCL-AM in Toronto by Jerry Howarth and Tom Cheek.

== See also ==
- 1992 Japan Series
