= Manuel Lee =

Dominican baseball player (born 1965)

- Shortstop / Second baseman
- Born: June 17, 1965 (age 60); San Pedro de Macorís, Dominican Republic
- Batted: Switch Threw: Right

MLB debut
- April 10, 1985, for the Toronto Blue Jays

Last MLB appearance
- April 26, 1995, for the St. Louis Cardinals

MLB statistics
- Batting average: .255
- Home runs: 19
- Runs batted in: 249
- Stats at Baseball Reference

Teams
- Toronto Blue Jays (1985–1992); Texas Rangers (1993–1994); St. Louis Cardinals (1995)

Career highlights and awards
- World Series champion (1992)

Manuel Lora Lee (born June 17, 1965) is a Dominican former professional baseball player who played as a shortstop and second baseman for Major League Baseball's Toronto Blue Jays (1985–92), Texas Rangers (1993–94) and St. Louis Cardinals (1995). He was originally signed as an amateur free agent with the New York Mets in 1982.

He helped the Blue Jays win the AL Eastern Division during his rookie season in 1985, and also in 1989 and 1991. In what would be his final season with the Blue Jays, he helped them to become the first Canadian team to win the World Series in 1992. He also helped the Rangers take the lead in the American League Western Division before the 1994 strike truncated the season.

In 11 seasons, he played in 922 games, had 2,693 at-bats, 304 runs, 686 hits, 88 doubles, 20 triples, 19 home runs, 249 RBI, 31 stolen bases, 201 walks, .255 batting average, .305 on-base percentage, .323 slugging percentage, 871 total bases, 43 sacrifice hits, 19 sacrifice flies and five intentional walks.

== Career ==
=== New York Mets ===
The New York Mets signed Lee as an amateur free agent on May 9, 1982, when he was 16 years old. Lee reported to the Kingsport Mets of the Appalachian League for the 1982 season, and in 54 at-bats, Lee hit .222 with no home runs and 3 RBI. He split the 1983 season between Mets Gulf Coast League team and the Little Falls Mets of the New York–Penn League, where he hit a .261 in 49 games between the two clubs.

Lee played the 1984 season with the Columbia Mets of the South Atlantic League, where he hit an impressive .329 in 102 games. On August 31, 1984, the Mets sent Lee, Gerald Young and Mitch Cook to the Houston Astros for Ray Knight.

=== Houston Astros ===
Lee did not play for Houston or any of their minor league affiliates as he was selected by the Toronto Blue Jays in the Rule 5 draft on December 3, 1984.

=== Toronto Blue Jays ===
Lee spent the entire 1985 season with the Blue Jays, mostly appearing as a defensive replacement late in the game. He made his major league debut on April 10, 1985, as a pinch runner in a game against the Kansas City Royals, in which Toronto won 1–0. He had his first official at-bat on April 24 against Kansas City, striking out against Mike Jones. Lee recorded his first major league hit in his eighth at-bat, singling against Rick Behenna of the Cleveland Indians on June 2 at Exhibition Stadium. Lee finished the season with a .200 batting average with no home runs or RBI in 40 at-bats. With the Blue Jays winning the American League East, they advanced to the 1985 ALCS, in which Lee went hitless in one at-bat, as Toronto lost to the Kansas City Royals in seven games.

Lee spent most of the 1986 season in the minor leagues, splitting time between the Knoxville Blue Jays and Syracuse Chiefs, with whom he hit a combined .256 with one home run. While with Toronto, Lee hit his first major league home run, a solo shot off of Mike Smithson of the Minnesota Twins on August 29, 1986. Lee appeared in 35 games with Toronto, hitting .205 with one home run and 7 RBI.

In 1987 he once again split the season between the majors and minors, appearing in 76 games with Syracuse, batting .283 in 251 at-bats, while batting .256 with one home run and 11 RBI with Toronto in 121 at-bats.

Lee became the Blue Jays starting second baseman in 1988, playing in 116 games, while batting .291 with two home runs and 38 RBI. In 1989, Lee split time with Nelson Liriano at second base, and occasionally filled in for shortstop Tony Fernández. Lee hit .260 with three home runs and 34 RBI while appearing in 99 games, helping Toronto win the division and advance to the playoffs. In the 1989 ALCS, Lee appeared in two games, batting .250 while scoring two runs as the Blue Jays lost to the Oakland Athletics in five games.

In 1990, Lee received the majority of playing time at second base, batting .243 with six home runs and 41 RBI, both career highs. In the off-season, the Blue Jays shifted Lee to become the starting shortstop, as they acquired second baseman Roberto Alomar in a deal with the San Diego Padres, trade which saw the departure of Fernandez. In 1991, Lee appeared in a career high 138 games, hitting .234 with no homers and 29 RBI. In the 1991 ALCS, Lee batted .125 in the Blue Jays five game loss to the Minnesota Twins.

Lee returned as the Blue Jays starting shortstop in 1992, He batted .263 with three home runs and 39 RBI. Toronto once again won their division, and faced the Oakland Athletics in the 1992 ALCS. In six games, Lee hit .278 with three RBI, as Toronto defeated Oakland to advance to the 1992 World Series against the Atlanta Braves. In the World Series, Lee batted .105 while the Blue Jays defeated the Braves in six games to win the championship.

On November 4, 1992, Lee was granted free agency.

=== Texas Rangers ===
On December 19, 1992, the Texas Rangers signed Lee as a free agent to become the team's starting shortstop. After missing the Rangers first eight games, Lee made his Texas debut on April 16, 1993, getting a hit and a run in a 5–3 loss to the New York Yankees at Yankee Stadium. Lee battled injuries during the season, appearing in only 73 games, batting .220 with one home run and 12 RBI. He rebounded in the 1994 season, as Lee hit .278 with two home runs and 38 RBI in 95 games with Texas before the season ended early due to the 1994 Baseball Strike. At the time of the strike, the Rangers were leading the American League West.

On October 28, 1994, Lee became a free agent.

=== St. Louis Cardinals ===
The St. Louis Cardinals signed Lee on April 18, 1995. He made his Cardinals debut on April 26, 1995, against the Philadelphia Phillies at Busch Stadium. Lee earned a hit in his first, and only Cardinals at-bat, as he left the game in the fourth inning due to an injury. The Cardinals sent Lee to the minor leagues for a rehab assignment, where in 12 games, he hit .308, however, St. Louis released Lee on June 22. Lee announced his retirement shortly after.
