= Devon White (baseball) =

Jamaican-American baseball player (born 1962)

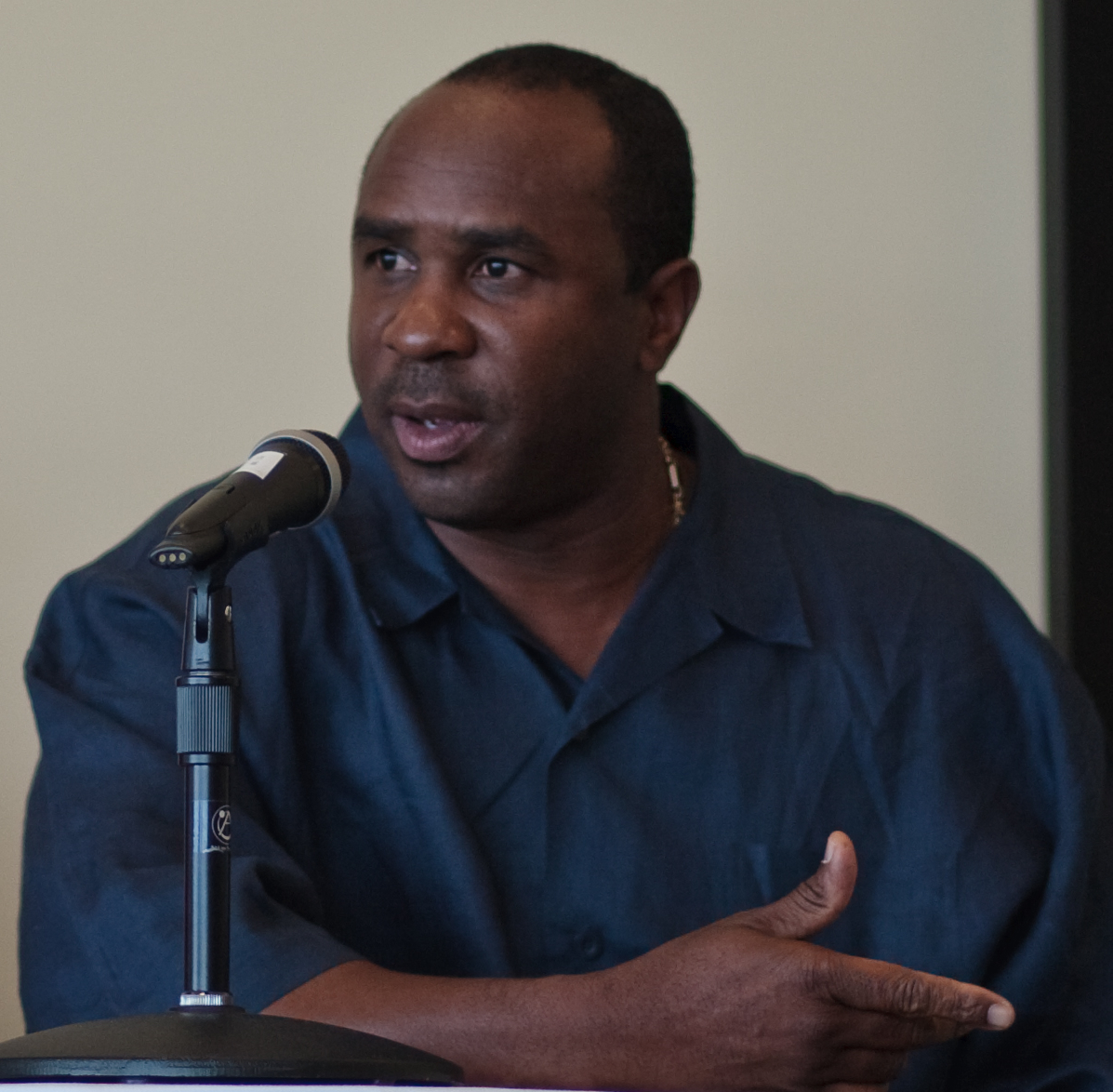
- White in 2009
- Center fielder
- Born: December 29, 1962 (age 63); Kingston, Jamaica
- Batted: Switch Threw: Right

MLB debut
- September 2, 1985, for the California Angels

Last MLB appearance
- October 5, 2001, for the Milwaukee Brewers

MLB statistics
- Batting average: .263
- Home runs: 208
- Runs batted in: 846
- Stats at Baseball Reference

Teams
- California Angels (1985–1990); Toronto Blue Jays (1991–1995); Florida Marlins (1996–1997); Arizona Diamondbacks (1998); Los Angeles Dodgers (1999–2000); Milwaukee Brewers (2001)

Career highlights and awards
- 3× All-Star (1989, 1993, 1998); 3× World Series champion (1992, 1993, 1997); 7× Gold Glove Award (1988, 1989, 1991–1995)

Devon Markes Whyte (formerly and commonly known as Devon White; born December 29, 1962), nicknamed "Devo", is a Jamaican former professional baseball center fielder, best known for his defensive ability at that position. He played in Major League Baseball (MLB) for the California Angels, Toronto Blue Jays, Florida Marlins, Arizona Diamondbacks, Los Angeles Dodgers, and Milwaukee Brewers. Following his playing career, White served as the first base coach for the Triple-A Buffalo Bisons, and was briefly called up to the Blue Jays as first base coach in 2022.

== Early life ==
Born as Devon Whyte in Kingston, Jamaica, his family immigrated to the United States when he was nine years old. However, the paperwork had their family name misspelled as "White". His last name was legally changed back to its original spelling in 2003 at the behest of his children, but throughout his baseball playing career, he was known as "Devon White" and continues to sign autographs with that spelling. His daughter, Davellyn Whyte, played two seasons of professional basketball in the WNBA.

White attended Park West High School in Manhattan, New York City. White was primarily a basketball player in high school and only began playing baseball after watching New York Yankees and Mets games on television with his father. White received a scholarship offer to play both college basketball and college baseball for the Oklahoma State Cowboys.

== Baseball career ==
=== California Angels ===
White was drafted by the California Angels in the 6th round of the 1981 draft. He made his major league debut in the late stages of the 1985 season for California, but he did not establish himself as a major leaguer until 1987, when he played a full season and hit with power and ran the basepaths with speed. In fact, he hit 24 home runs and stole 32 bases that season; he managed to steal at least fifteen bases and hit fifteen home runs before the All-Star break, and no rookie would do so again until 2022. In 1988, only his second full season, he won his first of seven Gold Gloves.

On September 9, 1989, he became one of the few players in baseball history to get on first base then score by stealing second base, third base, and home.

=== Toronto Blue Jays ===
On December 2, 1990, he was traded with Willie Fraser and Marcus Moore to the Toronto Blue Jays for Junior Félix and Luis Sojo.

White won two World Series and five Gold Glove awards with the Toronto Blue Jays. With a .336 batting average in his post-season career with the Blue Jays, compared to a .270 regular season average with Toronto, White consistently upped his game to help Toronto reach playoff success.

In 1992, White collected 3.9 Defensive Wins Above Replacement, which led the major leagues.

In Game 3 of the 1992 World Series against the Atlanta Braves, White was the central part of one of the most famous plays in World Series history. With David Justice batting and runners on first and second base, Justice hit a fly ball which White chased down and caught while jumping into the wall. White then threw the ball to second baseman Roberto Alomar, who threw to John Olerud at first to try to double up Terry Pendleton, but Pendleton had already been called out for running past Deion Sanders. Olerud promptly threw the ball to third baseman Kelly Gruber, who chased down Sanders, diving and clipping him on the heel with his glove. However, the umpire, Bob Davidson, did not see the tag and called Sanders safe, which cost the Jays the second triple play in World Series history. After the game, Davidson watched the replay and admitted he missed the call.

While playing for the team, White appeared on Canadian children's television show Under the Umbrella Tree, in uniform in what was then known as the SkyDome, talking with characters Jacob Bluejay and Iggy Iguana, in the 1993 episode "Baseball Fever."

=== Florida Marlins ===
After the 1995 season, White signed with the Florida Marlins and won another World Series in 1997, although he only hit .215 in the playoffs that year. He is notable for being the only player to be the batter for the last out of two different World Series in which he was a member of the winning team, as he flew out to Pete Incaviglia two at-bats prior to Joe Carter's walk-off home run that ended the 1993 series, and grounded out to his former teammate on the 1993 Toronto Blue Jays Tony Fernández who proceeded to throw Bobby Bonilla out at home in the play before Edgar Rentería's walk-off hit to end the 1997 series.

=== Later years ===
He later played with the Arizona Diamondbacks, the Los Angeles Dodgers, and the Milwaukee Brewers before retiring in 2002. On April 11, 2000, while leading off for the Dodgers as the first batter in the first game at Oracle Park (then called Pacific Bell Park) in San Francisco, White recorded the first base hit in the ballpark's history, off Giants pitcher Kirk Rueter.

=== Career statistics ===
In 1,941 games over 17 seasons, White posted a .263 batting average (1,934-for-7,344) with 1125 runs, 378 doubles, 71 triples, 208 home runs, 846 RBI, 346 stolen bases, 541 bases on balls, .319 on-base percentage and .419 slugging percentage. He finished his career with a .986 fielding percentage playing at all three outfield positions. In 49 postseason games, including three World Series, White batted .296 (56-for-189) with 27 runs, 12 doubles, 4 triples, 3 home runs, 20 RBI, 7 stolen bases, and 19 walks.

== Coaching career ==
In January 2017, White was hired by the Blue Jays organization to be the hitting coach of the Triple-A Buffalo Bisons. In July 2022, White was called up to the Blue Jays as the interim first base coach for incumbent Mark Budzinski who was on bereavement leave. White would not return to the Bisons coaching staff after the conclusion of the season. Since 2024, White has served as a "special assistant to player development" within the Jays organization.

== See also ==
- List of Major League Baseball career runs scored leaders
