= Candy Maldonado =

Puerto Rican baseball player (born 1960)

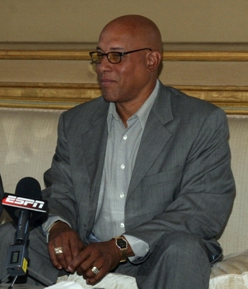
- Maldonado in 2009
- Right fielder / Left fielder
- Born: September 5, 1960 (age 65); Humacao, Puerto Rico
- Batted: Right Threw: Right

MLB debut
- September 7, 1981, for the Los Angeles Dodgers

Last MLB appearance
- September 29, 1995, for the Texas Rangers

MLB statistics
- Batting average: .254
- Home runs: 146
- Runs batted in: 618
- Stats at Baseball Reference

Teams
- Los Angeles Dodgers (1981–1985); San Francisco Giants (1986–1989); Cleveland Indians (1990); Milwaukee Brewers (1991); Toronto Blue Jays (1991–1992); Chicago Cubs (1993); Cleveland Indians (1993–1994); Toronto Blue Jays (1995); Texas Rangers (1995)

Career highlights and awards
- World Series champion (1992)

Cándido Maldonado Guadarrama (born September 5, 1960) is a Puerto Rican former Major League Baseball outfielder who played from 1981 to 1995 for the Los Angeles Dodgers, San Francisco Giants, Cleveland Indians, Milwaukee Brewers, Toronto Blue Jays, Chicago Cubs, and Texas Rangers. Chris Berman, a fellow ESPN analyst, nicknamed him, "the Candyman". Maldonado holds the distinction of having struck the first game-winning hit outside the United States in World Series play, and was the only Giant to hit a triple in the 1989 World Series.

== San Francisco ==
Maldonado, also known as "the Candyman", was a major part of the Giants success in the late 1980s as a part of the 1987 NL West Champions and the 1989 National League Champions.

Although Maldonado had statistically good seasons in San Francisco, he was involved in one of the most infamous plays in Giants history. In game 6 of the 1987 National League Championship Series, he lost Tony Peña's 2nd inning fly ball in the lights. This play resulted in a triple for Peña. Peña scored on a sacrifice fly for the only run of the game, which the St. Louis Cardinals won to tie the series at 3 games each, before going on to win Game 7.

== Career highlights ==
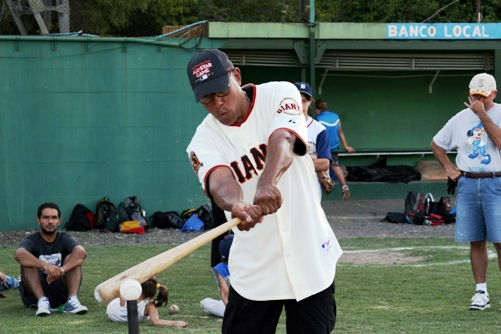
Maldonado at a free baseball clinic in Argentina in 2009.

Maldonado was a better hitter on the road than at home, with a batting average which was 51 points higher in road games than in home games.

On May 4, 1987, he became only the 16th player in San Francisco Giants franchise history to hit for the cycle.

In Game 3 of the 1992 World Series, playing for the Toronto Blue Jays, he hit a walk-off hit off Atlanta Braves closer Jeff Reardon and also hit a solo home run in Game 6 of the series.

Then in 1994, Candy scored the first-ever run for the Cleveland Indians at Jacobs Field.

Maldonado was noted as a good home run hitter who did not usually hit for a high batting average, finishing at .254 for his MLB career.

He played in eight different postseason series for three of his teams and won the World Series with the Blue Jays in 1992.

== Recent career ==
Maldonado provided color commentary for ESPN Deportes' coverage of the World Baseball Classic and regular season games. He was named general manager of the Gigantes del Cibao of the Dominican Baseball League. Maldonado contributed a video to "La Esquina de Candy" (or "Candy's Corner"). Also, in 2011, Maldonado was inducted into the Caribbean Baseball Hall of Fame with former teammate and National Baseball Hall of Fame inductee Roberto Alomar, Carlos Baerga and Luis "Mambo" DeLeón for the 2011 Caribbean Series. He was also inducted into his native Puerto Rico Baseball Hall of Fame.

== See also ==
- List of Major League Baseball players from Puerto Rico
- List of Major League Baseball players to hit for the cycle

Achievements
Preceded by Andre Dawson	Hitting for the cycle May 4, 1987	Succeeded by Tim Raines
