= Kelly Gruber =

American baseball player (born 1962)

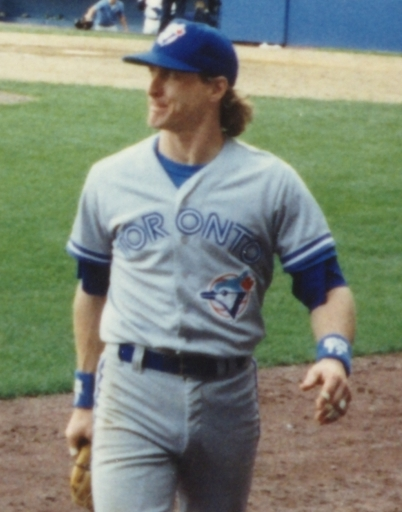
- Gruber in 1992
- Third baseman
- Born: February 26, 1962 (age 64); Houston, Texas, U.S.
- Batted: Right Threw: Right

MLB debut
- April 20, 1984, for the Toronto Blue Jays

Last MLB appearance
- June 29, 1993, for the California Angels

MLB statistics
- Batting average: .259
- Home runs: 117
- Runs batted in: 443
- Stats at Baseball Reference

Teams
- Toronto Blue Jays (1984–1992); California Angels (1993)

Career highlights and awards
- 2× All-Star (1989, 1990); World Series champion (1992); Gold Glove Award (1990); Silver Slugger Award (1990)

Kelly Wayne Gruber (born February 26, 1962) is an American former Major League Baseball (MLB) third baseman. He played for the Toronto Blue Jays and California Angels from 1984 to 1993. He was a two-time MLB All-Star and won a Gold Glove Award and Silver Slugger Award in 1990.

== Early life ==
Gruber was born on February 26, 1962. Gruber played baseball at Westlake High School in Austin, Texas, where his number was later retired.

== Early career ==
He was drafted by the Cleveland Indians in the 1st round (10th pick) of the 1980 amateur draft. On December 5, 1983, the Toronto Blue Jays picked him up in the Rule 5 draft. Gruber saw his first MLB action shortly thereafter, playing in his first game on April 20, 1984. Over the next three seasons, he split time between MLB and the minor leagues, earning an everyday spot in the Toronto line-up by 1987. The Toronto media quickly nicknamed him "Xanthos" (meaning blonde) after his long flowing blonde hair. During his stay in Toronto he was voted the city's most eligible bachelor.

== Best years ==
On April 16, 1989, Gruber was the first Blue Jay in history to hit for the cycle when he got four hits in six at–bats with six RBI and four runs scored. His cycle occurred in the following order: home run, double, triple, and single. He was told to stop at first for his single even though a double was easily attainable. Gruber had his best season in 1990, hitting .274 with 31 home runs, 118 RBIs and 14 stolen bases, winning Gold Glove and Silver Slugger awards and ending up fourth in MVP balloting that year.

== Later career ==
Gruber was a member of the 1992 World Series-winning Blue Jay team. In the fourth inning of Game 3, Gruber appeared to make a diving tag on Braves runner Deion Sanders' foot to record the third out of a triple play, which would have been only the second such play in World Series history. The second-base umpire, however, ruled Sanders safe. Gruber tore his rotator cuff on the play; however, he hit a key game-tying home run in the eighth inning, and the Jays won the game in walk-off fashion, later taking the series in six games. That postseason, Gruber became just the third player to have 40 or more postseason at-bats with a batting average under .100.

Gruber was traded to the California Angels for Luis Sojo in December 1992. Soon after his arrival, Gruber announced that he had bulging discs in his neck. Just over two months after the trade, Gruber had shoulder surgery to repair a rotator cuff tear. Gruber was expected to be sidelined for at least eight weeks. Angels manager Buck Rodgers was angered over the news of Gruber's surgery; he felt that the Blue Jays must have known about the extent of Gruber's injury before they traded him. Rodgers said that Rene Gonzales would be the team's third baseman that year.

Gruber returned to action in June, but after playing in only 18 games, Gruber went back on the disabled list with continued neck and shoulder problems the next month. In September, the team placed Gruber on waivers. He was owed $4 million for the 1993 season, but the Blue Jays agreed to pay $1.7 million of that total.

== See also ==
- List of Major League Baseball players to hit for the cycle

== Personal ==
In 1992, Gruber published his autobiography, Kelly, At Home on Third. On June 16, 2018, he made numerous controversial and offensive remarks at a PitchTalks event in Toronto, some directed at moderator Ashley Docking, prompting his uninviting from the upcoming Canadian Baseball Hall of Fame festivities.

Achievements
Preceded by Mike Greenwell	Hitting for the cycle April 16, 1989	Succeeded by Eric Davis
