= Roberto Alomar =

Puerto Rican baseball player (born 1968)

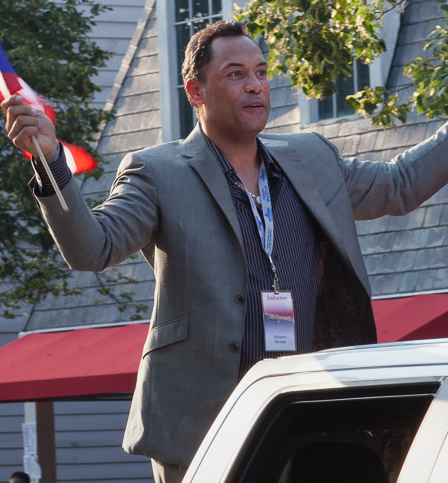
- Alomar in 2011
- Second baseman
- Born: February 5, 1968 (age 58); Ponce, Puerto Rico
- Batted: Switch Threw: Right

MLB debut
- April 22, 1988, for the San Diego Padres

Last MLB appearance
- September 5, 2004, for the Chicago White Sox

MLB statistics
- Batting average: .300
- Hits: 2,724
- Home runs: 210
- Runs batted in: 1,134
- Stolen bases: 474
- Stats at Baseball Reference

Teams
- San Diego Padres (1988–1990); Toronto Blue Jays (1991–1995); Baltimore Orioles (1996–1998); Cleveland Indians (1999–2001); New York Mets (2002–2003); Chicago White Sox (2003); Arizona Diamondbacks (2004); Chicago White Sox (2004)

Career highlights and awards
- 12× All-Star (1990–2001); 2× World Series champion (1992, 1993); ALCS MVP (1992); 10× Gold Glove Award (1991–1996, 1998–2001); 4× Silver Slugger Award (1992, 1996, 1999, 2000); Baltimore Orioles Hall of Fame

Member of the National

Baseball Hall of Fame
- Induction: 2011
- Vote: 90.0% (second ballot)

Roberto Alomar Velázquez (/ˈæləmɑːr/; Spanish pronunciation: [aloˈmaɾ]; born February 5, 1968) is a Puerto Rican former second baseman who played in Major League Baseball (MLB) for seventeen seasons. He is regarded as one of the greatest second basemen in baseball history and overall players of his generation. During his career, the 12-time All-Star won more Gold Glove Awards (10) than any other second baseman in baseball history, in addition to winning four Silver Slugger Awards for his hitting. Among second basemen, he ranks third in games played (2,320), fifth in stolen bases (474), sixth in plate appearances (10,400), seventh in doubles (504) and assists (6,524), and eighth in hits (2,724), runs (1,508), at-bats (9,073), and double plays turned (1,407). In 2011, Alomar was inducted into the National Baseball Hall of Fame.

The son of MLB second baseman Sandy Alomar Sr., Alomar followed in his father's footsteps, signing with the San Diego Padres as an amateur free agent in 1985. He made his major league debut with the team three years later, establishing himself as an exceptional base-stealing, hitting, and fielding threat before becoming an All-Star in 1990. He was traded to the Toronto Blue Jays the following off-season, leading the team to three consecutive American League Championship Series (ALCS) appearances and being named the 1992 ALCS Most Valuable Player (MVP), culminating in back-to-back World Series championships in 1992 and 1993. Alomar signed with the Baltimore Orioles after the 1995 season, led the team to two ALCS appearances, and won the 1998 All-Star Game MVP Award in his final year with the team. He then joined the Cleveland Indians for three seasons and had the most productive years of his career in 1999 and 2001, again leading his team to the playoffs and becoming an AL MVP Award finalist both years. Alomar spent the final years of his career with the New York Mets, the Arizona Diamondbacks and the Chicago White Sox, before retiring at spring training in 2005. A switch hitter, Alomar finished his career with a .300 batting average. Shortly after his 2011 Hall of Fame induction, the Blue Jays retired his number 12.

In 2021, Alomar was banned from baseball by MLB following an independent investigation into an allegation of sexual misconduct, dating back to 2014. In April 2021, the Blue Jays also announced that Alomar would be removed from the Level of Excellence and his retired number banner would be taken down at Rogers Centre. The Blue Jays subsequently reactivated the uniform number 12. Alomar remains the only player to currently be a member of both the Baseball Hall of Fame and MLB's permanently-ineligible list simultaneously.

== Early life ==
Alomar was born in Ponce, Puerto Rico to Santos "Sandy" Alomar Sr. and María Velázquez. He grew up in Salinas, Puerto Rico in a baseball family. He and his older brother Sandy Jr. did not see their father that often and lived with their mother, due to their father's career as a major league second baseman. When school in Puerto Rico was out for the summer, they joined their father, who let his sons hang around the clubhouse, shag fly balls, and absorb knowledge of the game—especially from his New York Yankees teammates including Thurman Munson and Graig Nettles. As a youth, Alomar idolized his father and José Cruz, both of whom were All-Star players.

== Career ==
=== San Diego Padres ===
In 1985, Alomar signed with the San Diego Padres at age 17, and joined the team's Class-A affiliate, the Charleston Rainbows. The following year, playing for the Reno Padres, he won the California League batting title with a .346 average.

Alomar made his major league debut on April 22, 1988, against the Houston Astros, recording a hit in his first at bat, off of Nolan Ryan. With the Padres, he established himself as a solid hitter and baserunner, and defensively, he displayed excellent lateral range and a powerful arm, often making spectacular plays on ground balls hit deep in the hole between first and second base, and on balls hit up the middle, well behind second base. He became an All-Star for the first time in 1990, as a reserve player for the National League.

=== Toronto Blue Jays ===
"I don't think we'd have ever gone to the World Series in '92 if he didn't hit that home run off Eckersley in Oakland that day like 4:30 in the afternoon when you could hardly see at the plate [because of the shadows]."

— Pat Gillick, Hall of Famer and former Blue Jays general manager

On December 5, 1990, Alomar and Joe Carter were traded to the Toronto Blue Jays in exchange for Fred McGriff and Tony Fernández. It was in Toronto that he developed into a premier offensive second baseman, combining a .300-plus batting average with power and high end speed on the bases. In 1991, he capitalized on his speed with 11 triples and 53 stolen bases, leading the team to its first of three consecutive playoff appearances. The following year, he scored 105 runs, drew 87 walks, and had a .405 on-base percentage. In 1993, Alomar had his best season with the Blue Jays, producing 17 home runs (HR), 93 runs batted in (RBI), and 55 stolen bases, while batting .326, third in the American League behind teammates John Olerud and Paul Molitor. He was a central figure in Toronto's World Series championships in 1992 and 1993; in Game 6 of the 1992 World Series, he scored the series-winning run on Dave Winfield's two-run double in the 11th inning. Alomar's game-tying, ninth-inning home run against Oakland relief ace Dennis Eckersley, in Game 4 of the 1992 American League Championship Series (ALCS), is considered by many as the most important hit in the club's history, as the team's three previous trips to the ALCS had ended in disappointment; he was named the Most Valuable Player (MVP) of the series. In 1995, he played 104 consecutive games without committing an error, setting an AL record for second basemen. In each of his five seasons with the Blue Jays, Alomar was named to the All-Star team and won the Gold Glove Award.

During his tenure with the Jays, Alomar became the face of the team due to his good looks and TV commercials alongside his ability, in what was called "Robbiemania". A book signing for Alomar's biography Second to None at Hillcrest Mall had to be cancelled after mall security reacted to an unruly crowd.

=== Baltimore Orioles ===
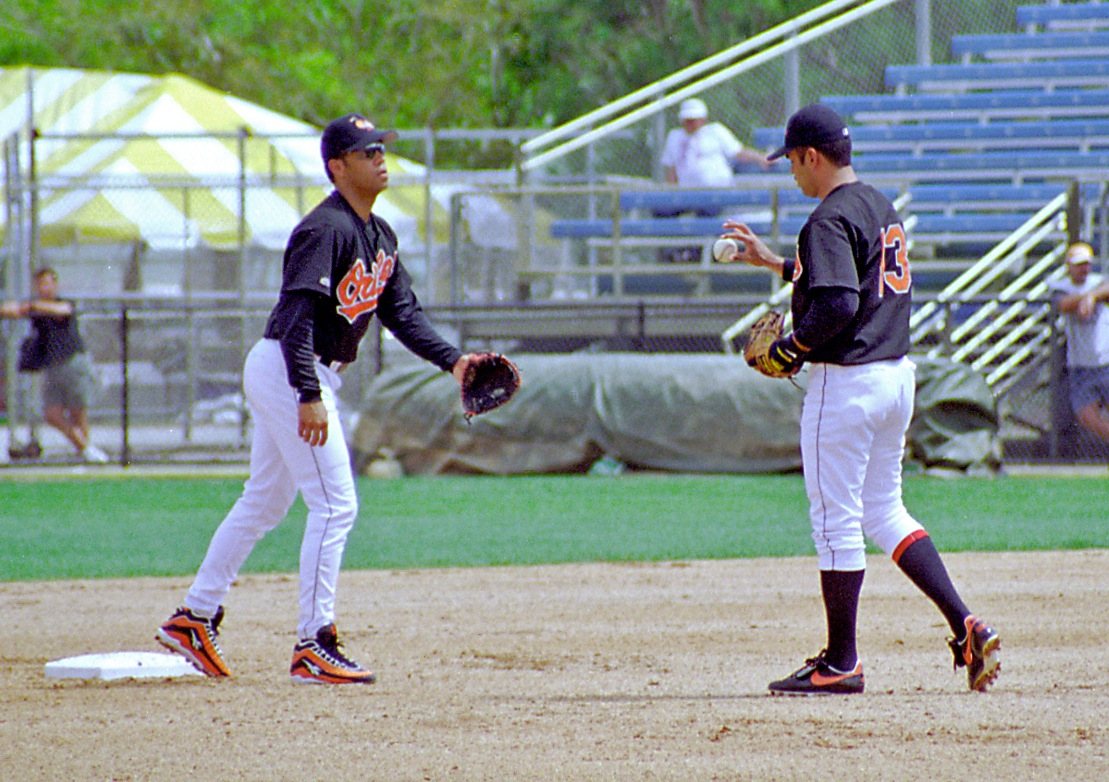
Alomar (left) with Ozzie Guillén during spring training, 1998

On December 21, 1995, Alomar signed with the Baltimore Orioles at a time when Toronto was looking to rebuild, while Baltimore was improving into a pennant-contending team. In Baltimore, he paired with Hall of Famer Cal Ripken Jr. to form a formidable double-play combination. Alomar appeared in the playoffs in 1996 and 1997 for the Orioles, hitting a series-winning home run in Game 4 of the 1996 American League Division Series (ALDS), although the Orioles were defeated in the ALCS both years. In 1998, he was named the Major League Baseball (MLB) All-Star Game MVP.

==== Spitting incident ====
On September 27, 1996, during a game against the Blue Jays in the SkyDome, Alomar got into a heated argument over a called third strike with umpire John Hirschbeck and spat in his face. Alomar defended himself by saying Hirschbeck had uttered a racial slur and that Hirschbeck had been bitter since one son had died of ALD and another had been recently diagnosed as well. Upon hearing of Alomar's comments, Hirschbeck had to be physically restrained from confronting Alomar in the players' locker room.

Alomar was suspended for the first five regular-season games in 1997 and donated $50,000 to ALD research. Alomar and Hirschbeck settled their differences publicly and made apologies to each other on April 22, 1997, standing at home plate and shaking hands in front of the crowd before an Orioles game.

=== Cleveland Indians ===
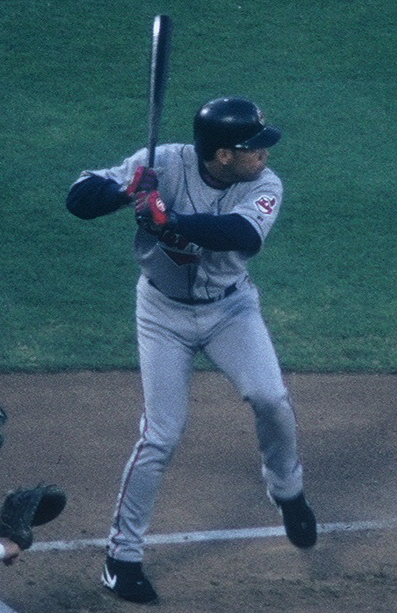
Alomar with the Indians in Oakland

On November 24, 1998, Alomar signed a four-year contract with the Cleveland Indians, joining his All-Star brother, Sandy Jr. It was in Cleveland that Alomar had two of his finest seasons. In 1999, he hit .323 and set career highs with 24 home runs, 120 RBI, 138 runs, 99 walks, a .422 on-base percentage and a .533 slugging percentage. In 2001, he batted .336/.415/.541, with 20 home runs, 100 RBI, and 30 steals. Cleveland made the playoffs in 1999, losing in the ALDS to the Boston Red Sox; in 2001, they again made the playoffs, but lost to the Seattle Mariners in the ALDS. Alomar finished third in AL MVP voting in 1999 and fourth in 2001.

On the field, Alomar teamed with shortstop Omar Vizquel to form another decorated middle infield combination. The Vizquel-Alomar duo won three consecutive Gold Gloves together, becoming one of just eight shortstop-second baseman duos to have accomplished this feat in the same year.

Alomar was traded to the New York Mets before the 2002 season, for pitcher Billy Traber and outfielders Matt Lawton and Alex Escobar.

=== Last years of career ===
In 2002, Alomar hit only .266/.331/.376 with 53 RBI and 73 runs scored, while falling apart defensively at second base. The Mets were puzzled by Alomar's mediocre play, which some attributed to his lack of comfort with being under the greater scrutiny of the New York fans and media. However, not even a midseason trade back to the American League to the Chicago White Sox in 2003 could revive Alomar from his funk. There was more misery ahead with the Arizona Diamondbacks in 2004, including a two-month disabled stint with a broken right hand. On August 5, Alomar returned to the White Sox, and hit just .263/.321/.392 in 56 games.

Alomar agreed to a one-year contract with the Tampa Bay Devil Rays for the 2005 season. However, on March 19, 2005, after a spring training plagued by back and vision trouble, he announced his retirement.

== Legacy ==
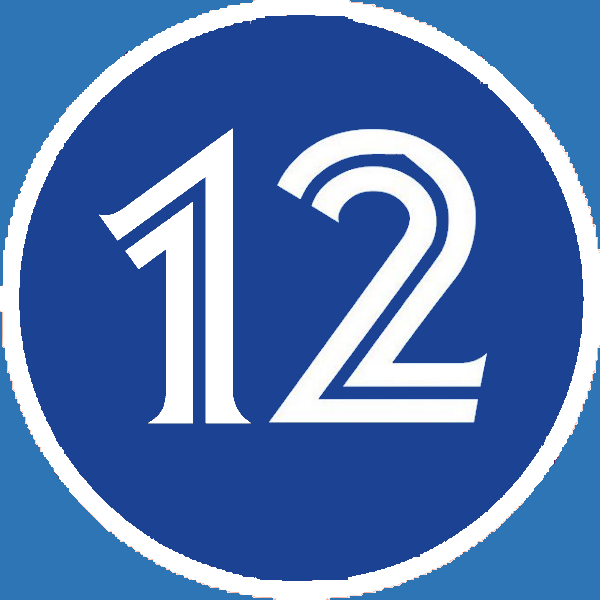
Roberto Alomar's number 12 was retired by the Toronto Blue Jays in 2011 (It was placed back into circulation in 2021 when an allegation of sexual misconduct by Alomar came to light.).

Time called Alomar "the best second baseman of t[his] generation" and he is regarded as one of the greatest second basemen and all-around players of all time. Known for his acrobatic and flamboyant style of defense, Alomar won 10 Gold Glove Awards, establishing a major league record for second basemen. He ranks in the top 10 of several all-time categories for second basemen, including games played, stolen bases, plate appearances, doubles, assists, hits, runs, at bats, and double plays turned. In a 17-year career, he was a .300/.371/.443 hitter with 210 home runs and 1,134 RBI; his .307 career batting average as a member of the Blue Jays is a franchise record. He was the Blue Jays Player of the Year in 1991, 1992, and 1995, as well as the Cleveland Indians Man of the Year in 1999 and 2001. A clutch hitter, Alomar had a .313 postseason average, including a .347 average in two World Series appearances. His game-tying home run in Game 4 of the 1992 ALCS is often considered the most important hit in Blue Jays history, as it changed the fortunes of the franchise.

Alomar was known for having a "sixth sense" or "sixth tool"—awareness—which distinguished him from other players. His former manager Davey Johnson said of him, "He reminds me of some of the great players that I've played with, who seem like they write their own script ... Frank Robinson's one, Henry Aaron was the other." He became only the third Puerto Rican to be elected to the Baseball Hall of Fame, after Roberto Clemente and Orlando Cepeda, and has since been joined by Iván Rodríguez, Edgar Martínez, and Carlos Beltrán

== Post-playing honors and activities ==
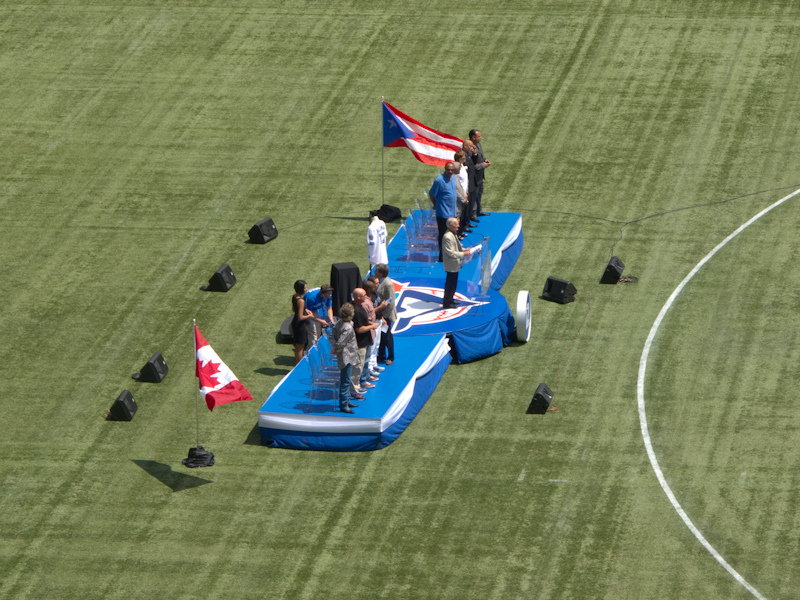
Alomar's jersey retirement ceremony in Toronto on July 31, 2011

On April 4, 2008, Alomar was inducted into the Blue Jays Level of Excellence at Rogers Centre, prior to the team's home opener. He has since been removed from the Blue Jays Level of Excellence due to an allegation of sexual misconduct.

In 2010, Alomar's first year of Hall of Fame eligibility, he missed induction by eight votes. His 73.7% of the vote was the highest percentage of votes in any player's first year on the ballot without being elected. Some baseball writers expressed shock that he failed to get in on the first ballot, but many attributed the near miss to sportswriters holding a grudge over the 1996 spitting incident with John Hirschbeck, including Alomar's brother Sandy Jr. and Hirschbeck himself. He was elected to the Hall of Fame in his second year of eligibility, with 90% of the vote (523 of 581 ballots cast). On July 24, 2011, Alomar was inducted into the Hall of Fame, becoming the first inductee to be depicted as a Blue Jays player on his plaque.

On June 19, 2010, Alomar was inducted into the Canadian Baseball Hall of Fame in St. Marys, Ontario. The 2011 Caribbean Series was dedicated to him and the series was followed by his induction into the Caribbean Baseball Hall of Fame. On March 31, 2011, he was named as a special assistant with the Blue Jays. In 2012, he began hosting the annual Tournament 12 (T12) showcase at Rogers Centre for Canadian baseball prospects; major leaguers Josh Naylor, Mike Soroka, and Abraham Toro are alumni of the tournament. On July 31, 2011, the Blue Jays retired Alomar's number 12 at Rogers Centre. He was the first Blue Jay to be so honored. The number has since been unretired after the Blue Jays severed all ties to him due to an allegation of sexual misconduct.

On August 3, 2013, Alomar was inducted into the Baltimore Orioles Hall of Fame. On November 12, 2013, he launched a baseball equipment line, Alomar Baseball. On September 24, 2015, Alomar was inducted into the Ontario Sports Hall of Fame in Toronto. He guest-starred on an episode of Canadian sitcom Mr. D in an episode when students ran an "Alomar for President" campaign during the Student Council Elections. In 2017, MLB Commissioner Rob Manfred named Alomar a special consultant, tasked with helping grow baseball in Puerto Rico. In July 2020, it was announced that Alomar was launching an expansion team in the Liga de Béisbol Profesional Roberto Clemente. The team, based in San Juan and named RA12 (after his initials and uniform number), began competing during the 2020–21 season. He also became a member of the LBPRC Board of Directors.

== Sexual misconduct allegation ==
On April 30, 2021, Alomar was fired from both the Blue Jays and MLB amid reports that MLB was investigating a claim from a female Blue Jays staffer that Alomar had sexually harassed her in 2014. According to The Sports Network, the staffer was preparing to sue Alomar, the Blue Jays, and MLB. Later on April 30, Manfred announced that following an investigation into that allegation that had taken several months, Alomar had been placed on MLB's ineligible list. At the same time, the Blue Jays severed all ties with Alomar, removing his name from the "Level of Excellence" at the Rogers Centre, taking down his Hall of Fame banner and returning his #12 jersey to circulation. However, he remains enshrined in the Hall of Fame. Alomar's number was officially unretired August 1, 2023 when newly acquired pitcher Jordan Hicks donned number 12 and entered the game for the Blue Jays in the ninth inning.

After the actions taken by MLB and the Blue Jays, the complainant declined to pursue further legal action.

Alomar addressed the allegations in a 2026 interview with the Toronto Sun, stating "I know I haven’t done anything wrong. (...) I asked my lawyer, what did they have on me? He said they believed her story more than they believed yours. That was what it came down to."

== Personal life ==
In 1996, a Canadian woman who became obsessed with Alomar was sentenced to nine months in prison for plotting to murder him. She was arrested with a loaded gun after telling security at the SkyDome of her plans.

Alomar and Puerto Rican model Maripily Rivera were married on June 1, 2009. In 2010, Rivera alleged that she had been a victim of domestic violence on three occasions, including her life being threatened with a knife by Alomar, and she wanted to end the marriage. Alomar alleged that Rivera had threatened to divorce him unless he gave her half ownership of his Tampa residence. The divorce was finalized on July 12, 2011, with a private settlement.

On December 12, 2012, Alomar married Kim Perks, from Toronto at the Art Gallery of Ontario. Their first daughter was born in 2014 and they live in Toronto.

Alomar has been sued by at least four women, including his ex-wife, for allegedly exposing them to HIV. He was in a relationship with professional tennis player Meghann Shaughnessy from 2004 to 2006, and she claimed Alomar exposed her to HIV. The lawyer of Alomar's ex-wife stated Alomar paid $4 million in settlements to Shaughnessy and Ilya Dall, another ex-girlfriend.

== Awards and highlights ==
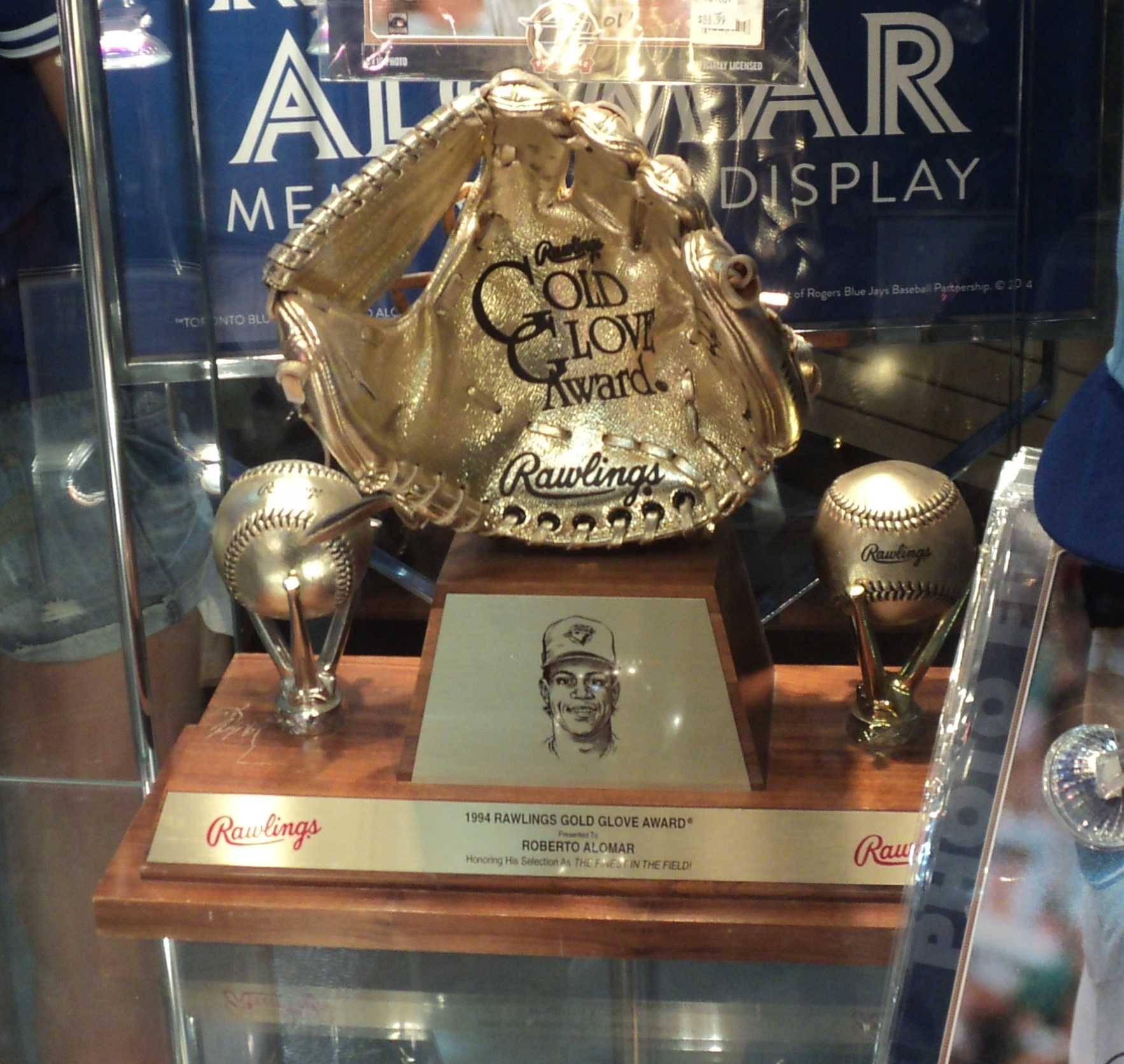
Alomar's 1994 Gold Glove Award

=== Awards ===
Award / Honor	Time(s)	Date(s)
MLB All-Star	12	1990–2001
AL Gold Glove Award (2B)	10 (MLB Record)	1991–96, 1998–2001
AL Silver Slugger Award (2B)	4	1992, 1996, 1999, 2000
Toronto Blue Jays Player of the Year	3	1991, 1992, 1995
Cleveland Indians Man of the Year	2	1999, 2001
ALCS Most Valuable Player	1	1992
MLB All-Star Game Most Valuable Player	1	1998

=== Statistical highlights ===
League leader

- Runs scored (1999)
- Sacrifice bunts (1989)
- Sacrifice flies (1999)
- Plate appearances (1989)
- Fielding percentage at second base (1992, 1995, 1999, 2001)
- Stolen base percentage (2000)

Other milestones

- batted over .300 nine times (1992–97, 1999–2001)
- posted an on-base percentage over .400 five times (1992, 1993, 1996, 1999, 2001)
- scored 100 or more runs six times (1992, 1993, 1996, 1999–2001)
- drove in 100 or more runs twice (1999, 2001)
- stole 30 or more bases eight times (1989, 1991–93, 1995, 1999–2001)

== See also ==
- Cleveland Indians award winners and league leaders
- Toronto Blue Jays award winners and league leaders
- List of Gold Glove middle infield duos
- List of Silver Slugger Award winners at second base
- List of Major League Baseball annual runs scored leaders
- List of Major League Baseball career doubles leaders
- List of Major League Baseball career hits leaders
- List of Major League Baseball career runs scored leaders
- List of Major League Baseball career runs batted in leaders
- List of Major League Baseball career total bases leaders
- List of Major League Baseball career plate appearance leaders
- List of Major League Baseball career putouts as a second baseman leaders
- List of Major League Baseball career stolen bases leaders
- List of Major League Baseball players from Puerto Rico
- List of people banned from Major League Baseball
- List of second-generation Major League Baseball players
