= Bill Mazeroski's 1960 World Series home run =

Historic baseball play

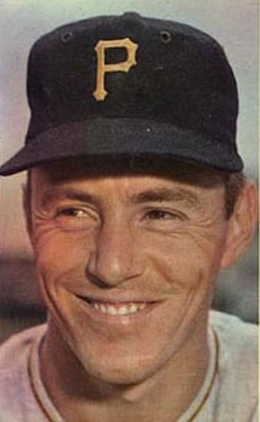
Hall of Famer Bill Mazeroski hit his iconic home run off pitcher Ralph Terry, winning the game and the 1960 World Series for the Pittsburgh Pirates.

In Game 7 of the 1960 World Series at Forbes Field in Pittsburgh, Pennsylvania on October 13, 1960, the Pittsburgh Pirates' Bill Mazeroski hit a solo walk-off home run in the bottom of the ninth inning against New York Yankees pitcher Ralph Terry to give the Pirates a 10–9 win and their first championship since 1925. With the count one ball and zero strikes, Mazeroski's line drive toward deep left field cleared the wall, becoming the first of two times the World Series has ended on a walk-off home run, and the only time it has happened in Game 7. The second and most recent World Series-winning walk-off homer was hit by Joe Carter for the Toronto Blue Jays in 1993, although it occurred in Game 6.

== Background ==
On the heels of a subpar season for Mazeroski and his fourth-place team, the 1960 campaign exceeded the wildest dreams of Pittsburgh sports fans. The Battlin' Bucs, as they would become known, dominated the National League virtually from the start to claim their first pennant since the 1927 season. Meanwhile, Mazeroski was an NL starter in both All-Star Games.

The Pirates seized control of the pennant race in August, when they won 21 of 31 games with Mazeroski in a lead role. He hit .373, drove in 16 runs, and had a 26-game errorless streak in the month. The 95-59 Pirates finished seven games ahead of second-place Milwaukee for the NL pennant. The team was rewarded with a trip to the 1960 World Series, where the second baseman forged his legacy against the New York Yankees with a pair of game-winning home runs. The 1960 Pirates team featured eight All-Stars, but was widely predicted to lose the World Series to a powerful New York Yankees team.

Before their 1960 season, the Yankees made a trade with the Kansas City Athletics in which they acquired outfielder Roger Maris. In his first Yankees season, Maris hit a single, double, and two home runs in his first game as a Yankee. He was named to the AL All-Star roster again and played in both games. He finished the season leading the AL in slugging percentage (.581), runs batted in (112), and extra base hits (64). He also hit 39 home runs and had a .283 batting average. He won the American League's Most Valuable Player award and was recognized as an outstanding defensive outfielder with a Gold Glove Award. The Yankees won the American League pennant, the first of five consecutive pennants.

The New York Yankees headed into the World Series with a 15-game winning streak, the 8th longest streak in the American League this century, after Dale Long's two-run 9th-inning home run gave them an 8–7 win over the Boston Red Sox. The 193 home runs are an AL season record, three better than the 1956 Yankees. RBI leader Roger Maris drove in three runs, but fell one home run short of Mickey Mantle's league-high 40.

The 1960 Yankees won the AL pennant for the 10th time in 12 years under Casey Stengel, and outscored the Pirates 55–27 in the seven World Series games.

=== Postseason ===
Yankees manager Casey Stengel picked Art Ditmar, who had won the most games, 15, to start for the Yankees, rather than the established star, Whitey Ford. The Pirates knocked Ditmar out of the game in the first inning. In a portent of things to come, Bill Mazeroski's two-run 5th-inning home run off Jim Coates was the difference as Pittsburgh beat the Yankees 6–4 in its first World Series win since 1925. Roy Face survived a two-run 9th-inning Elston Howard home run to preserve Vern Law's victory.

In Game 2, Mickey Mantle hit two home runs in a Yankees 16–3 victory at Forbes Field, evening the World Series. A seven-run 6th inning overwhelmed Pittsburgh.

At Yankee Stadium for Game 3, Bobby Richardson collected six RBI, including a grand slam off reliever Clem Labine in a six-run first inning, and Whitey Ford pitched a four-hitter 10–0 shutout to give the Yankees a 2–1 World Series lead, spoiling Pittsburgh manager Danny Murtaugh's 43rd birthday.

Vern Law won again in Game 4, thanks to his own RBI single and Bill Virdon's two-run hit. Roy Face retired the final eight batters in order. The Pittsburgh Pirates' 3–2 win evened the 1960 World Series.

In Game 5, Bill Mazeroski starred again. His two-run double to left field off Art Ditmar scored Don Hoak and Gino Cimoli. This staked Harvey Haddix to a 3–0 lead in the fourth inning. Roy Face was called on once more for another hitless effort to preserve a 5–2 win over the Yankees and a 3–2 World Series lead for the surprising Pirates.

In Game 6, Whitey Ford preserved the Yankees' hopes with a seven-hit shutout at Forbes Field. Bob Friend was bombed again as the Yankees coast 12–0. Bobby Richardson's two run-scoring triples gave him a World Series record of 12 RBI. Of Pittsburgh's three losses, Friend was on the hook for two, racking up a 13.50 ERA over his three appearances.

The Yankees outscored Pittsburgh 55–27, and administered three thrashings (16–3, 10–0, and 12–0), but the resilient Pirates took the other four contests by a run differential of only +7 (6–4, 3–2, 5–2, and 10–9).

== The setup ==
=== World Series Game 7 ===
The drama of Mazeroski's home run was heightened by the excitement that preceded the home run: A combined total of seven runs were scored by both teams in a wild and wacky bottom of the eighth and top of the ninth. An oddity in this game – it is the only World Series game this century with no strikeouts recorded.

Dick Groat had an RBI single and scored in the eighth inning, in which the Pirates scored five runs to take a 9–7 lead.

Gil McDougald entered the game as a pinch runner in the top of the ninth, and he scored on Yogi Berra's ground ball to tie the game at 9–9.

After winning Game 5 as a starter, Harvey Haddix relieved late in Game 7 and was credited with the win when Mazeroski hit his Series-ending, famous walk-off home run. Haddix went 2–0 in the 1960 Series, with a 2.45 ERA.

The infield developed a "rock-hard" surface throughout Forbes Field's history. During the final game of the 1960 World Series, Yankees shortstop Tony Kubek was struck in the neck with a ball that bounced off the hard dirt surface. This broke up a potentially rally-killing double play and caused Kubek to exit the game during the eighth inning. Bill Virdon ultimately reached first base on the infield single. This started a rally for the Pirates.

Pirates catcher Hal Smith helped set the stage for Mazeroski's dramatic home run one inning earlier, when he capped off a Pirates rally with a pivotal three-run home run of his own. Smith's home run put the Pirates ahead 9–7, but its true value was realized when the Yankees scored two runs in the top of the ninth inning to tie the score. Thus, instead of Mazeroski coming to bat in the bottom of the ninth with the score 9–6 in favor of the Yankees, the game was tied with the winning run (in the form of Mazeroski) at the plate.

=== The play ===
One of the greatest games in baseball history got wilder yet in the top of the ninth inning, when the Yankees plated two runs to forge a 9-9 deadlock. At that point, Mazeroski admittedly got caught up in the sudden turn of events. It seemed the second baseman had forgotten that he was to lead off the bottom half of the inning, and it wasn't until first base coach Lenny Levy reminded him that he hurriedly picked up a bat.

Johnny Blanchard was the catcher who called the pitch. At precisely 3:36 p.m. local time, on a 1-0 count, Mazeroski slammed Terry's high fastball just to the left of the 406-foot marker in distant left-center field. Yogi Berra, who was playing left field, later said that the ball just grazed the top of the wall before it went over, and on films of the home run, Berra can be seen starting to back away from the wall just before the ball disappeared, in anticipation of the ball bouncing off the wall. Mazeroski excitedly finished his sprint around the bases before he was mobbed at home plate. "You know, all I could think about was, "We beat the Yankeesǃ We beat themǃ We beat the damn Yankeesǃ" he said.

Fourteen-year-old schoolboy Andy Jerpe retrieved the ball amid the cherry trees in Schenley Park, which was adjacent to the ballpark. Jerpe just happened to be strolling by the ballpark when he retrieved the ball, and it wasn't until he showed it to a police officer patrolling the ballpark gates that both realized what Jerpe had. Jerpe was then escorted to the Pirates clubhouse, and he offered the ball to Mazeroski, but after taking some pictures with the ball for the press, Mazeroski let Jerpe keep it, saying, "The memory's good enough for me." Mazeroski signed the ball for Jerpe, but the keepsake was lost during a neighborhood game a short time later.

Even though Mazeroski hit .320 with team highs of five RBI, four runs scored, and two home runs, Yankees counterpart Bobby Richardson was selected the Most Valuable Player of the series. Coincidentally, Mazeroski, who wore #9 for the Pirates, came to bat in the bottom of the 9th inning with the score tied 9-9.

== The calls ==
There's a drive into deep left field, look out now…! That ball is going … going ... gone! The World Series is over! Mazeroski … hits it over the left field fence for a home run, and the Pirates win it 10-9 and win the World Series!… And the fans go wild.

— Mel Allen on NBC television.

Chuck Thompson, the play-by-play announcer for NBC Radio,(Audio) is particularly remembered for his flawed but endearing call of the homer. The event was replayed in full on an MLB radio special some years ago, during one of the players' strikes. The pitcher was actually Ralph Terry; Art Ditmar was warming up in the bullpen, and besides that error, as well as relaying the final score incorrectly at first, Thompson just got caught up in the moment:

Well, a little while ago, when we mentioned that this one, in typical fashion, was going right to the wire, little did we know … Art Ditmar throws ... here's a swing and a high fly ball going deep to left, this may do it! … Back to the wall goes Berra, it is … over the fence, home run, the Pirates win! … (long pause for crowd noise) … Ladies and gentlemen, Mazeroski has hit a one-nothing pitch over the left field fence at Forbes Field to win the 1960 World Series for the Pittsburgh Pirates by a score of ten to nothing! … Once again, that final score … The Pittsburgh Pirates, the 1960 world champions, defeat the New York Yankees. The Pirates ten, and the Yankees NINE! ... and Forbes Field ... is an insane asylum!

In 1985, Thompson's Ditmar-Terry flub became a commercial hit, featured as an audio-over in a nostalgia-immersed Budweiser TV ad during that year's World Series. A libel lawsuit subsequently filed by Ditmar against Anheuser-Busch and its advertising agency for the commercial was ultimately rejected by a United States District Court.

== Aftermath ==
The 1960 Pirates were the only team between 1945 and 2001 to have not succumbed to the so-called "Ex-Cubs Factor" in the postseason. They also became the first team to win a World Series on a home run, a feat later achieved by the Toronto Blue Jays in 1993, although Joe Carter's home run came in Game 6 of the 1993 Series. Mazeroski's homer remains the only walk-off home run in Game 7 of a World Series.

After Forbes Field was demolished, the section of the left-field wall where the home run left the park was moved to the Pirates' new home of Three Rivers Stadium, and still later was moved to their current home, PNC Park. A line of bricks marks that section of the wall, next to a preserved wall section, and a plaque indicating the spot where Mazeroski's homer left the park is embedded in the current sidewalk.

Bing Crosby's association with the Game 7 walk-off home run became notable because he reportedly preserved the only known footage of the event. Crosby, an American singer and actor who was one of the most popular entertainers of the mid-20th century, was also a part-owner of the Pittsburgh Pirates during the late 1940s and early 1950s. At a time when live sports broadcasts were rarely recorded, Crosby kept a personal television recording of the game, which is widely cited as the sole surviving visual documentation of the moment.

The portion of the left field wall over which Bill Mazeroski hit his walk-off home run to end the 1960 World Series, between the scoreboard and the "406 FT" sign, no longer stands at its original location. A portion of that wall, including the distance marker, had been sliced off and moved to the Allegheny Club at Three Rivers Stadium. Before the Three Rivers demolition, the section of the wall was salvaged, and in 2009, it was restored and placed on the Riverwalk outside of PNC Park. Meanwhile, the original location of that wall is outlined by bricks extending from the left-center field wall across Roberto Clemente Drive and into the sidewalk. A plaque embedded in the sidewalk marks the spot where Mazeroski's home run cleared the wall. The left-center and center field brick wall with "457 FT" and "436 FT" painted on it still stands at its original location, along with the stadium's flagpole, adjacent to the University of Pittsburgh's Mervis and Posvar Halls. Despite not technically being the correct section of wall where Mazeroski's famous home run cleared, it is often locally referred to as "Mazeroski's Wall." This portion of the wall remained after Forbes Field was torn down, and was refurbished in 2006 in time for the All-Star Game hosted in Pittsburgh. In addition, a wooden replica of an entrance to the stadium, including a ticket window and players entrance, was constructed and placed near the remaining wall in 2006. The home plate used in the stadium's final game remains preserved in the University of Pittsburgh's Posvar Hall. However, its location has been altered; author John McCollister wrote, "Had architects placed home plate in its precise spot about half of the Pirates fans could not view it. The reason: it would have to be on display in the fifth stall of the ladies' restroom." However, the original location of the home plate has been more recently determined by others to be approximately 81 feet (25 m) away from its current display, just inside the GSPIA/Economics Library, and not in a restroom as has been popularly believed.

A ceremony is held each October 13 at the outfield wall in Oakland to listen to a taped broadcast of the final game of the 1960 World Series. The tradition was started by Squirrel Hill resident Saul Finkelstein, who at 1:05 pm on October 13, 1985, sat alone at the base of the flagpole and listened to the NBC radio broadcast of Chuck Thompson and Jack Quinlan. Finkelstein continued the tradition for eight more years, until word spread and other people began attending in 1993. On October 13, 2000—the game's 40th anniversary—over 600 people attended to listen to the broadcast, including Mazeroski himself. For the 50th anniversary, on October 13, 2010, a plaque honoring Mazeroski was dedicated and more than 1,000 attended the broadcast, including Mazeroski and several other former Pirates.

In September 2010, a statue of Mazeroski was unveiled outside PNC Park, depicting his legendary home run celebration — a runner pose with both arms extended, ball cap in right hand.

== See also ==
- Joe Carter's 1993 World Series home run
