= Sam Bat =

Canadian baseball bat manufacturer

- Industry: Baseball
- Founded: 1997; 28 years ago
- Founder: Sam Holman
- Headquarters: Carleton Place, Canada
- Key people: Arlene Anderson (president, co-owner); Jim Anderson (co-owner); Paul Balharrie (co-owner); Sam Holman (co-owner)
- Products: Baseball bats
- Website: sambat.com

Sam Bat, officially The Original Maple Bat Corporation, is a Canadian company based in the town of Carleton Place, Ontario that manufactures baseball bats. It was the first company to supply baseball bats manufactured from maple wood to professional baseball players. As of 2013, it is one of 32 licensed baseball bat suppliers for Major League Baseball (MLB) and Minor League Baseball (MiLB) players. It is also a bat supplier for baseball leagues throughout the world, including Germany, Japan, Korea, Italy, Mexico, and the Netherlands. It is the official bat manufacturer for the Australian Baseball League.

The company was founded in 1997 by Sam Holman, who manufactured bats in his garage at the company's inception. Its president is Arlene Anderson, who with her husband Jim and investor Paul Balharrie acquired shares in the company in 2008.

== Background ==
Sam Holman was raised in Kansas City and rural South Dakota. After serving in the United States Army, he married a Canadian woman and moved to Ottawa. They later divorced, after which he became a stagehand carpenter at the National Arts Centre. He quit in 1994 after sustaining a knee injury.

After spring training in 1996, Holman's friend Bill Mackenzie, who was working as an MLB baseball scout for the Colorado Rockies, told him that baseball bats were breaking too frequently, asking Holman if he could "do something about it". Holman read about the physics of baseball and researched baseball bat patents. After some trials with ironwood, he eventually settled on using maple wood, which has greater density than the traditional ash wood, to manufacture bats.

He manufactured his first bat in his garage from a stairway bannister, and tested the 33-ounce bat with local children before Mackenzie suggested a test trial with the Ottawa Lynx, a nearby Triple-A minor league team in the International League. Among the players to test the bat was Fernando Seguignol, who became the first professional player to hit a home run with a maple bat. In April 1997, Holman went to Toronto, where he met with Joe Carter, Carlos Delgado, and Ed Sprague Jr., convincing them to test his bats during batting practice.

Holman established the company with financing from his sister in 1997 following the successful trial of his bats by the Toronto Blue Jays. Carter used a Sam Bat, which was not officially licensed by MLB at the time, by sneaking it into a game during the 1997 season, hitting a home run in one of his at-bats. He became the company's first MLB client. In 1998, MLB approved the maple bat for use in games, and Sam Bat became an authorized licensee of MLB.

Holman continued to manufacture baseball bats in a workshop at his home until opening a 29,000-square-foot (2,700 m^{2}) factory on a 2-acre (8,100 m^{2}) site in Gatineau in late 2001. In November 2011, the company moved to North Industrial Park in Carleton Place.

Holman's brother Nathan designed the bat logo.

== Production ==
The company does not disclose the source of wood for its bats, neither supplier nor region. In the past, it has sourced its wood from a supplier in the Catskill Mountains. The bats it manufactures are made from Acer saccharum, also known as rock maple or sugar maple. The company purchases veneer-grade cylindrical billets having 8% moisture weighing between 4.9 to 6 pounds (2.2 to 2.7 kg). The billets are sorted by weight after being weighed "to the thousandth ounce", and the slope of the grain is visually graded; billets with the straightest grain are reserved for MLB players.

Each bat model can be manufactured using billets in a small range of weights (for example, the bat manufactured for Miguel Cabrera is made from billets between 5.380 to 5.420 pounds (2.440 to 2.458 kg), usually 5.400 pounds (2.449 kg)). After a final visual inspection, it is mounted into a wood tracer lathe, which in up to four minutes shapes the billet to match a template, leaving sufficient material for sanding. The bat's handle and barrel are then measured with a caliper to ensure it meets the template's specifications, and for models that require it, the end of the barrel is cupped (a small indentation is carved into the head of the barrel to shift the bat's centre of gravity toward the handle). The superfluous ends are cut off, and it is then mounted into a sanding lathe, which smooths the bat to its desired weight.

A drop of ink is placed about 12 inches (30 cm) from the base of the handle, and follows the wood's grain. The path it follows is measured with a protractor using a magnifying glass, and those diverging by more than 3° are rejected. This "ink-dot test" is required by Major League Baseball to ensure bats used in MLB games are less prone to break. Microscopic scratches are smoothed, the bat is painted to the specifications defined by the player for whom it was produced, and the player's name and bat model are laser engraved on the barrel. Each bat is labelled with the logo of a bat and the term "Rideau Crusher", a reference to the nearby Rideau Canal. It is finished with a coat of varnish and dried overnight before being shipped with silica gel, a desiccant that controls humidity to ensure the moisture in the bat does not change.

== Clients ==
After the 1997 Major League Baseball season, Carter became a free agent, playing for the Baltimore Orioles and later the San Francisco Giants. While with the Giants, he told slugger Barry Bonds about the maple bats. Holman brought a set of bats to spring training in the 1999 season, where he met Bonds, who tested them during batting practice. In the 2001 season, Bonds hit 73 home runs using the Sam Bat, setting a single-season home run record.

Bonds became Sam Bat's best client, citing the personal contact with "the man who's bent over making the bats", and the popularity of maple-based bats increased significantly after he began using them. By 2015, the company had 185 MLB players as clients, among them Ryan Braun, Miguel Cabrera, Yoenis Céspedes, Dustin Pedroia, Troy Tulowitzki, and Chase Utley.

== Finances ==
In 2006, Holman listed the company for sale on eBay for $3.5 million, citing his age and that the company was underfunded. In addition to the factory, machinery, and kilns, he advertised the company's patents and a "client list of the world's top hitters in baseball". At the time, the company had nine employees, produced about 17,000 bats a year generating sales of US$1.3 million ($2 million in 2024), with about 150 Major League Baseball hitters as clients.

Holman did not expect any bids from the listing, which he used partly as a means to advertise the sale of his business. This also provided Holman some time to find investors. Three of five parties that eventually contacted him about purchasing the business learned of it as a result of the eBay listing. In 2007, Paul Balharrie, and husband and wife Arlene and Jim Anderson bought shares in the company. The Andersons own 50% of the company, and Arlene Anderson became the company's president.

Bonds worried that his bat supply may no longer be guaranteed, wrote a cheque for $40,000 to assure delivery of 80 bats during the season. This stabilised the company's finances, enabling it to buy wood it needed to manufacture the bats.

== Legacy ==
Initially, Sam Bat was the only company producing maple baseball bats for use in professional and amateur games. With its success, by 2006 there were 30 companies that had developed maple baseball bats to compete with Sam Bat.

The company now earns 85% of its revenue from international markets, including France, Germany, Japan, Korea, Italy, Mexico, and the Netherlands. It is the official bat manufacturer for the Australian Baseball League.

In 2004, Holman received an invitation to meet George W. Bush (President of the United States) and Condoleezza Rice (United States Secretary of State nominee) during a state visit to Ottawa. On 26 November 2004, a member of the Office of the Prime Minister asked Holman to prepare a bat as an official state gift for the president, an avid baseball fan who had previously owned the Texas Rangers. During a reception at the Canadian Museum of History on 30 November, he presented two bats, one inscribed with "Prez 43" and "to the future commissioner of baseball", the other for his father George H. W. Bush inscribed with "Prez 41" and "to the father of the future commissioner of baseball". Later at the reception, Holman arranged a telephone conversation between Bonds and his fan Rice.
