= Joe Carter =

American baseball player (born 1960)

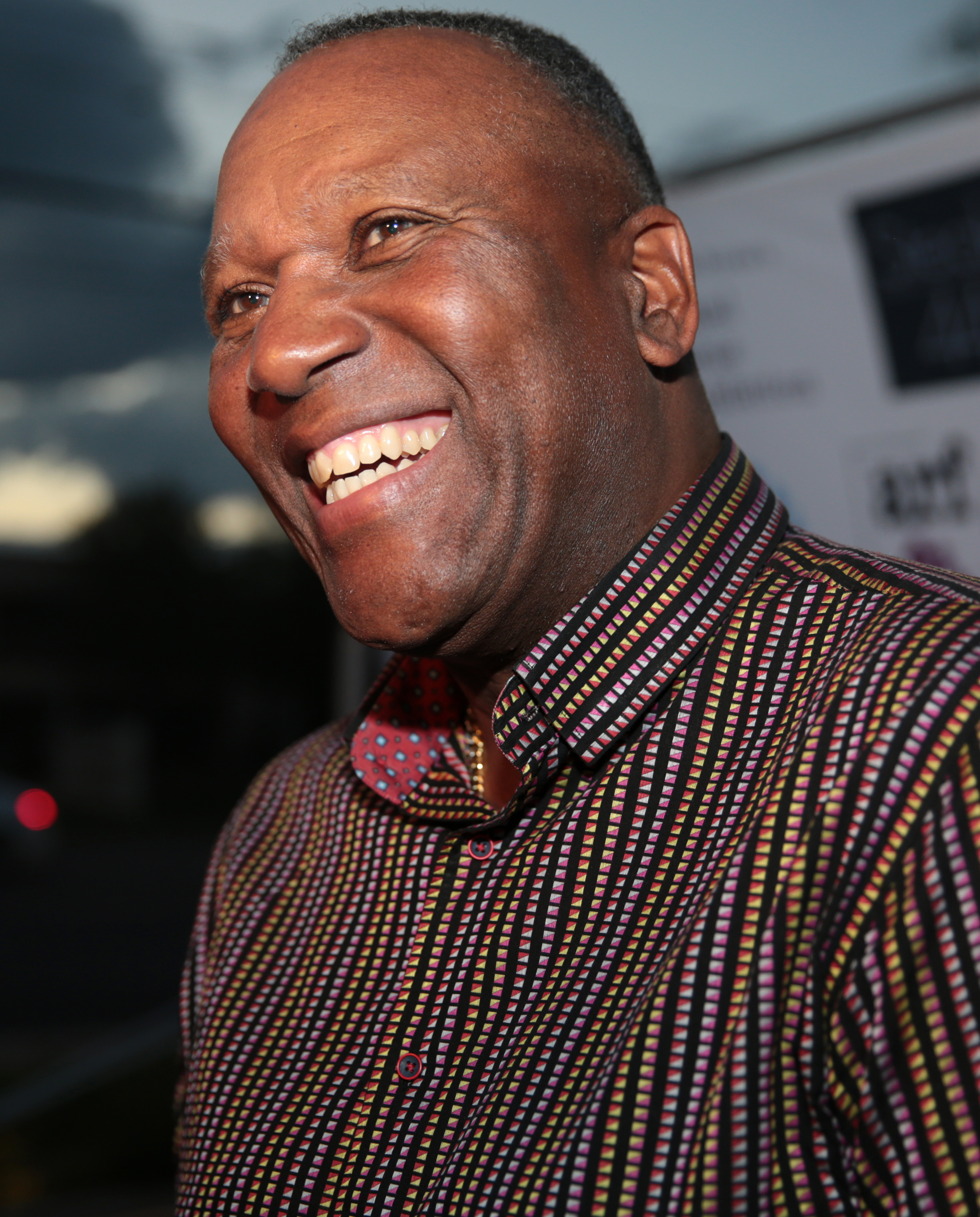
- Carter in 2017
- Outfielder / First baseman
- Born: March 7, 1960 (age 66); Oklahoma City, Oklahoma, U.S.
- Batted: Right Threw: Right

MLB debut
- July 30, 1983, for the Chicago Cubs

Last MLB appearance
- September 28, 1998, for the San Francisco Giants

MLB statistics
- Batting average: .259
- Hits: 2,184
- Home runs: 396
- Runs batted in: 1,445
- Stats at Baseball Reference

Teams
- Chicago Cubs (1983); Cleveland Indians (1984–1989); San Diego Padres (1990); Toronto Blue Jays (1991–1997); Baltimore Orioles (1998); San Francisco Giants (1998)

Career highlights and awards
- 5× All-Star (1991–1994, 1996); 2× World Series champion (1992, 1993); 2× Silver Slugger Award (1991, 1992); AL RBI leader (1986); Toronto Blue Jays Hall of Excellence

Member of the Canadian

Baseball Hall of Fame
- Induction: 2003

Joseph Chris Carter (born March 7, 1960) is an American former professional baseball player. He played in Major League Baseball (MLB) as an outfielder and first baseman for the Chicago Cubs, Cleveland Indians, San Diego Padres, Toronto Blue Jays, Baltimore Orioles, and San Francisco Giants.

Carter first excelled in baseball at Wichita State, which saw him bat .430 in three seasons and played with the team in their first ever appearance in the NCAA tournament in 1980. Carter was selected as the second overall pick in the 1981 MLB draft by the Chicago Cubs. After spending two years in the minor leagues, he made his major league debut in 1983 but played in just 23 games before eventually being part of the trade to Cleveland that sent Rick Sutcliffe to Chicago. In the 1986 season, he led the American League in runs batted in (RBI) with 121 while having the first of twelve seasons with at least twenty home runs.

Carter was subject to two trades in the span of a year that saw him play with San Diego in 1990 and Toronto in 1991, with the latter being the team he ultimately played nearly half of his career with. In seven seasons with the team, he was named to the All-Star Game five times and won his two Silver Slugger Awards in 1991 and 1992. Carter recorded the final out in the 1992 postseason run that saw the Blue Jays win their first ever championship. In the 1993 World Series, with the Blue Jays trailing in the 9th inning of Game 6 and runners on base, Carter hit a walk-off home run to win the championship for the Blue Jays, which made him the second player (after Bill Mazeroski in 1960) to end a World Series with a home run; it proved to be Carter's final postseason appearance as a player.

Carter played with Toronto until the 1997 season, where he recorded his tenth and final season with at least 100 RBIs. He played his final season with Baltimore and San Francisco in 1998 before retiring. In over 2,000 games, Carter had 2,184 hits with 396 home runs and 1,445 RBIs with a .259 career batting average. Carter was inducted into the Toronto Blue Jays Level of Excellence in 1999 and the Canadian Baseball Hall of Fame in 2003.

== Amateur career ==
Joe Carter was a three-sport athlete at Millwood High School in Oklahoma City and was named to the All-State team in Track.

Joe Carter attended Wichita State University, leaving after his junior year. He was named The Sporting News magazine's College Player of the Year in 1981.

== Professional career ==
=== Draft and minor leagues ===
In the 1981 MLB draft, the Chicago Cubs chose him with the second overall pick. He began to blossom in the minor leagues in 1982, batting .319 with 25 home runs and 98 RBIs in 110 games for the Midland Cubs of the AA Texas League. He was promoted to the AAA Iowa Cubs in 1983, where he batted .307 with 22 home runs and 83 RBIs in 124 games.

=== Chicago Cubs (1983) ===
The Cubs promoted Carter to the major leagues in 1983. He hit .176 in 23 games, and began the 1984 season back in Iowa.

=== Cleveland Indians (1984–1989) ===
On June 13, 1984, Carter was traded with three other players to the Cleveland Indians for Rick Sutcliffe, George Frazier, and Ron Hassey. Carter enjoyed a breakout season with the Indians in 1986, when he led the major leagues with 121 runs batted in and recorded career highs of 200 base hits, 341 total bases, and 108 runs scored. In Cleveland, Carter established himself as a prolific power hitter, hitting as many as 35 home runs in a season and regularly driving in 100 or more runs. He usually hit nearly as many doubles as he did homers, and would get respectable numbers of triples in many years too. He was also a very good baserunner, stealing 20-30 bases a year with a high rate of success; in 1987, Carter became a member of the single-season 30–30 club for home runs/stolen bases.

=== San Diego Padres (1990) ===
After the 1989 season, the Indians traded Carter to the San Diego Padres for prospects Sandy Alomar Jr., Carlos Baerga, and Chris James. Although he continued to drive in runs, he also continued to have defensive problems. The Padres subsequently dealt him to the Toronto Blue Jays along with Roberto Alomar in exchange for star players Fred McGriff and Tony Fernández.

=== Toronto Blue Jays (1991–1997) ===
Joe Carter is a member of the Toronto Blue Jays' Level of Excellence.

Carter's overall game improved dramatically in 1991, as he helped the Toronto Blue Jays win the division title and hit the game-winning single that clinched the AL East championship; he also emerged for the first time as a team leader. In 1992, he helped the Jays win their first World Series championship, the first ever won by a Canadian-based team. Carter hit two home runs and recorded the final out of the Series, taking a throw to first base from reliever Mike Timlin to nab Otis Nixon of the Atlanta Braves, who bunted. This was the first time a World Series ended on a bunt.

Carter and Edwin Encarnación are the only two Blue Jays to hit two home runs in one inning, with Carter's coming against the Baltimore Orioles in 1993 and Encarnacion's against the Houston Astros in 2013.

==== 1993 World Series ====
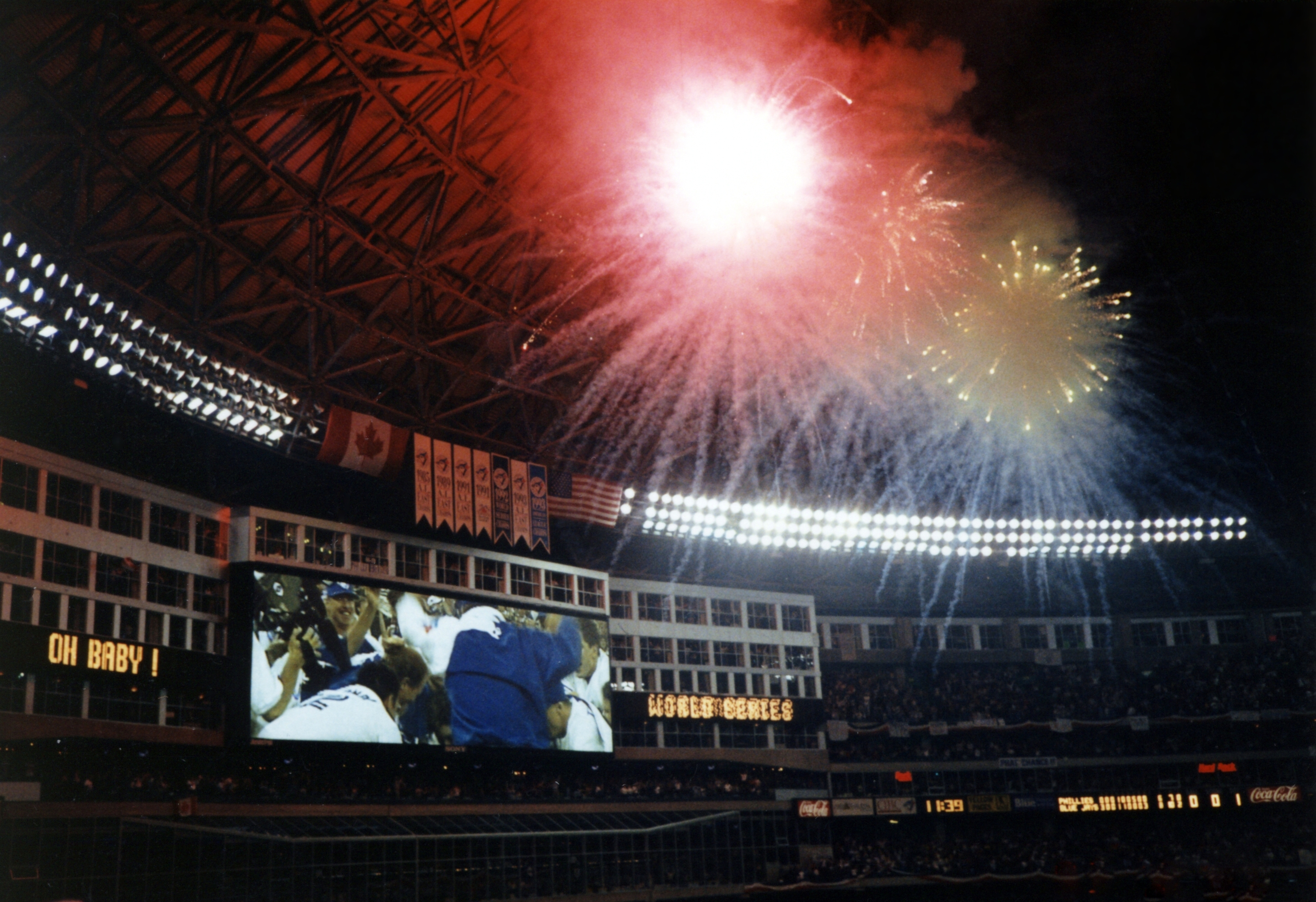
Fireworks in SkyDome after Carter's World Series-winning home run

In 1993, the Blue Jays reached the World Series again, facing the Philadelphia Phillies. In Game 6, with the Blue Jays leading three games to two, Carter came to bat with one out in the bottom of the ninth inning with the Blue Jays trailing 6–5 and Rickey Henderson and Paul Molitor on base. On a 2–2 count, Carter hit a three-run walk-off home run off Phillies pitcher Mitch Williams (against whom he had previously been 0–4 in his career) to win the World Series, only the second time a Series has ended with a home run (the other being in 1960, when Bill Mazeroski did it for the Pittsburgh Pirates against the New York Yankees), and the only time the home run has been hit by a player whose team was trailing in the bottom of the ninth inning in a potential championship clinching game. Upon hitting the home run, Carter jumped up and down many times, most notably while rounding first base, where his helmet came off. Tom Cheek, the Blue Jays' radio broadcaster, called the play: "Touch 'em all, Joe, you'll never hit a bigger home run in your life!"

==== 1994–1997 ====
Carter continued to play for the Blue Jays until 1997, and led the Blue Jays in home runs and RBIs in 1994 and 1995.

When he represented the Blue Jays at the 1996 All-Star Game, hosted by the Phillies at Veterans Stadium, he received boos for his World Series home run. During the 1997 season, he snuck an unlicensed maple wood baseball bat manufactured by Sam Bat into a game.

=== Baltimore Orioles and San Francisco Giants (1998) ===
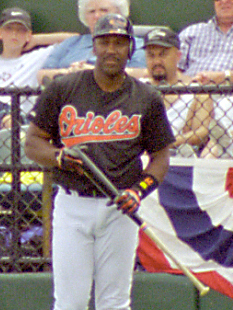
Carter with the Baltimore Orioles in spring training, 1998

He became a free agent in 1998 and briefly played for the Baltimore Orioles and San Francisco Giants before retiring. Carter ended his career by popping out to end the game in a one-game playoff against the Chicago Cubs.

=== Career statistics ===
Carter was named to five All-Star teams. In his career he hit 396 home runs and drove in 1445 runs. He drove in 100 runs in a season ten times, including the 1994 year, which was cut short due to the strike that occurred 115 games into the year. He was the first player to record 100 RBI for three different teams in three consecutive seasons. In his career timespan from 1983 to 1998, nobody had more RBIs than Carter. In 1993, Carter set an American League record when he hit three home runs in a game for the fifth time in his career (this record has since been matched by three players, with the first being Carlos Delgado, who coincidentally played with the Blue Jays).

Carter was also involved in the final plays of four games in which the Blue Jays clinched a championship: 1) The game-winning single to drive home Roberto Alomar and clinch the 1991 American League East division championship, 2) catching the final out at first base in the 1992 World Series, 3) catching the final out on a fly ball to right field in the 1993 American League Championship Series, and 4) the walk-off home run in Game 6 of the 1993 World Series.

== Post-retirement ==
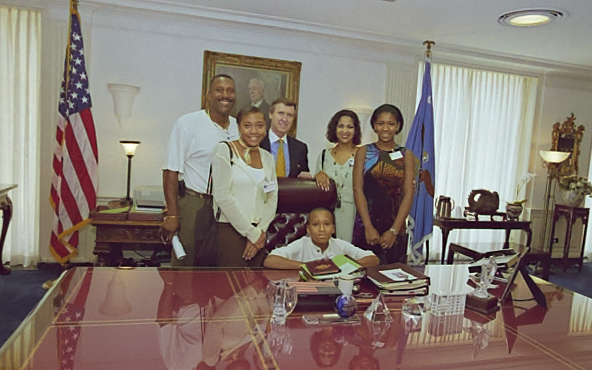
Carter (left) and his family with United States Secretary of Defense William Cohen at the Pentagon in 1998

From 1999 to 2000, Carter served as a color commentator for the Toronto Blue Jays on CTV Sportsnet, leaving to work for the Chicago Cubs. From 2001 to 2002, Carter served as the color commentator, alongside play-by-play man Chip Caray, for the Chicago Cubs on WGN-TV. Carter was replaced by the man whom Carter himself replaced, Steve Stone.

Carter became eligible for the Baseball Hall of Fame in 2004, however, he received 19 votes, representing 3.8% of the vote and was dropped from future ballots. Carter is currently eligible for induction via the Today's Game era committee.

Carter was inducted into the Canadian Baseball Hall of Fame in 2003.

In September 2006, Carter was awarded the Major League Baseball Hometown Heroes Award, as the former or current player who best represents the legacy of his franchise's history, as voted by fans.

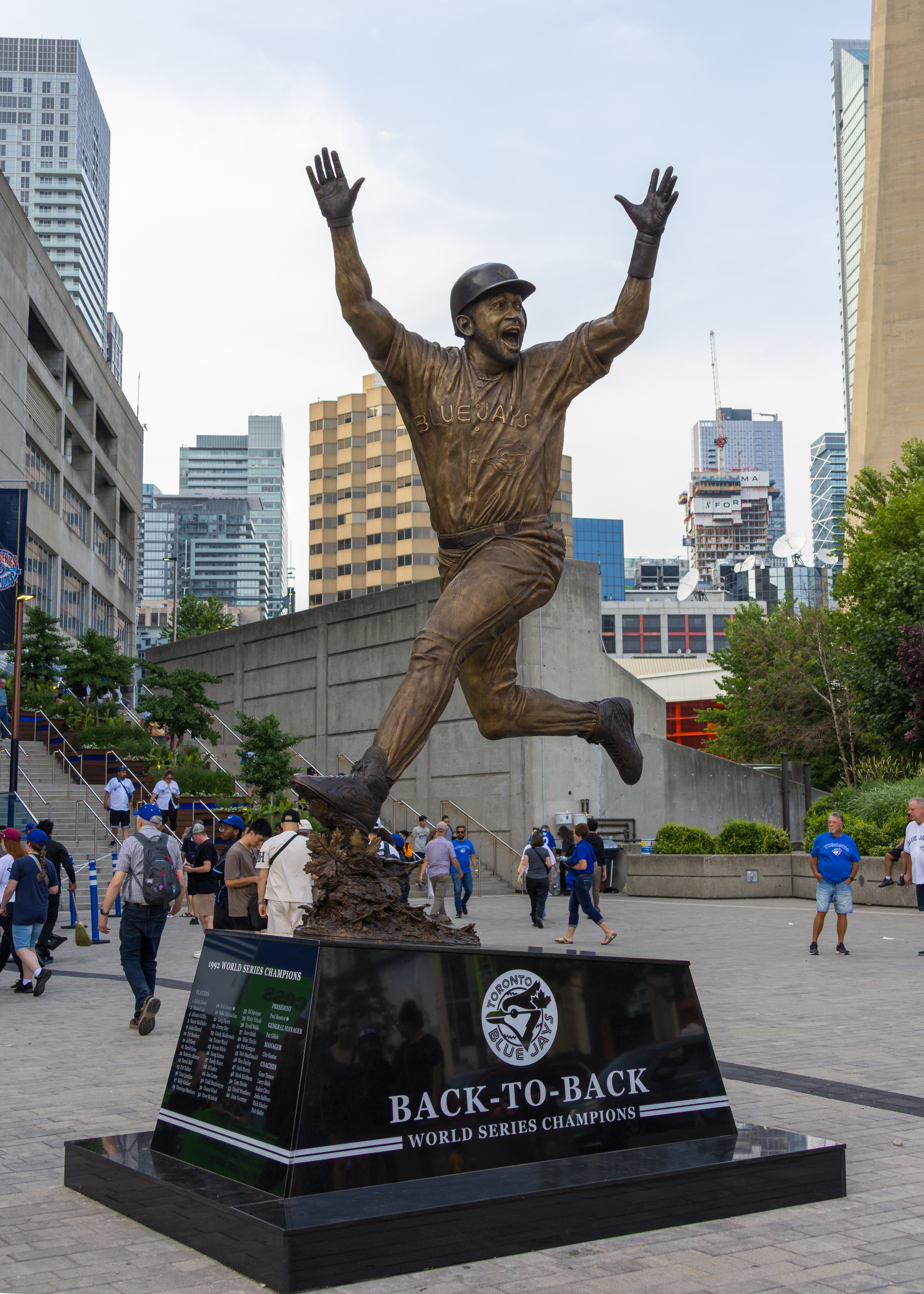
Statue of Carter outside the Rogers Centre

In 2008, Carter appeared on an episode of Pros vs. Joes.

On August 7, 2009, Carter, along with many of his 1992 and 1993 Toronto Blue Jay World Series alumni teammates, attended a reunion/pre-game ceremony at the SkyDome. The event was organized by Carter himself and included three dozen players, coaches and athletic trainers from the Blue Jays' 1992 and 1993 World Series rosters.

On May 19, 2012, the Cleveland Indians honored Carter with a bobblehead giveaway bearing his likeness during their game against the Miami Marlins. Carter attended and signed autographs, as well as throwing out the ceremonial first pitch.

On July 14, 2015, in a pregame ceremony before the 2015 All-Star Game, it was announced that Carter was elected by fans as a Franchise Four member of the Toronto Blue Jays, as one of the four most valuable players in franchise history.

On July 18, 2026, the Blue Jays unveiled a statue depicting Carter mid-jump titled Back-to-Back, honoring the team's 1992 and 1993 World Series champions. It is located outside the Rogers Centre and replaced an existing statue of Ted Rogers.

== Charity involvement ==
Carter co-chairs the annual "Joe Carter Classic", a celebrity golf tournament in the Toronto area founded in 2010 to benefit the Children's Aid Foundation. The tournament has raised over $2.5 million for the foundation. Previous events have featured celebrities including Charles Barkley, Ray Bourque, and Gordie Howe.

== In popular culture ==
- In the 1999 Canadian hip hop single, "Let's Ride" by Choclair, one of the verses cites Carter's walk-off home run in the 1993 World Series, "It was the 9th inning, with two outs, I hit the home run to left field like Carter did to Philly". In actuality, there was only one out when Carter hit his home run.
- In the 1999 film Big Daddy, a plot twist at the end of the film revealed by Jon Stewart's character, Kevin Gerrity, is that he fathered a child conceived in Toronto as a by-product of celebrating Carter's walk-off home run to win the 1993 World Series, and later meeting a woman that same night while inebriated.
- In July 2015, Carter's walk-off home run celebration was used as the track artwork for the song "Back to Back" released by Toronto native Drake.

== Awards and honors ==
- 5× All-Star (1991, 1992, 1993, 1994, 1996)
- 2× Silver Slugger Award winner (1991, 1992)
- 2x World Series Champion (1992, 1993)
- Toronto Blue Jays Level of Excellence
- In 1988, Carter was inducted into the Wichita State University Pizza Hut Shocker Hall of Fame.
- In 1999, Carter was inducted into the Missouri Valley Conference Hall of Fame.
- In 2003, Carter was inducted into the Canadian Baseball Hall of Fame.
- In 2004, Carter was inducted into the Ontario Sports Hall of Fame.
- In 2008, Carter was inducted into the Kansas Baseball Hall of Fame.

== See also ==
- Cleveland Guardians award winners and league leaders
- List of Major League Baseball career extra base hits leaders
- List of Major League Baseball career home run leaders
- List of Major League Baseball career hits leaders
- List of Major League Baseball career runs batted in leaders
- List of Major League Baseball career runs scored leaders
- List of people from Oklahoma City
- List of Wichita State University people
- Toronto Blue Jays award winners and league leaders

Awards and achievements
Preceded by Rubén Sierra; Chris Hoiles	American League Player of the Month; June 1991; April 1994	Succeeded by Robin Ventura; Frank Thomas
Sporting positions
Preceded by Steve Stone	Chicago Cubs television color commentator 2001–2002	Succeeded by Steve Stone
