= Joe Carter's 1993 World Series home run =

1993 baseball play

In Game 6 of the 1993 World Series at SkyDome in Toronto, Ontario, Canada on October 23, 1993, the Toronto Blue Jays' Joe Carter hit a one-out, three-run walk-off home run off Philadelphia Phillies closer Mitch Williams to give the Toronto Blue Jays its second consecutive championship.

It was the first World Series win with a walk-off home run by a team that was trailing, and just the second World Series to end on a walk-off home run. In 1960, Pittsburgh Pirates second baseman Bill Mazeroski hit a home run off New York Yankees pitcher Ralph Terry to win Game 7 by a score of 10–9.

Radio sportscaster Tom Cheek's call of "Touch 'em all, Joe! You'll never hit a bigger home run in your life!" is regarded as an iconic moment in Toronto sports history.

== Background ==
After the 1992 season, the Blue Jays let World Series hero Dave Winfield and longtime closer Tom Henke go but signed two key free agents: designated hitter Paul Molitor from the Milwaukee Brewers and perennial playoff success Dave Stewart from the Oakland Athletics.

In 1993, the Blue Jays had seven All-Stars: outfielders Devon White and Joe Carter, infielders John Olerud and Roberto Alomar, designated hitter Molitor, plus starting pitcher Pat Hentgen, and closer Duane Ward. In August, the Jays acquired former nemesis Rickey Henderson from the Athletics. In the regular season, three Blue Jays—John Olerud, Paul Molitor and Roberto Alomar—finished 1-2-3 for the AL batting crown. The Blue Jays cruised to a 95–67 record, one less win than 1992 and seven games ahead of the New York Yankees, winning their third straight division title.

The 1993 Phillies were led by stars such as Darren Daulton, John Kruk, Lenny Dykstra, and Curt Schilling. The team was often described as "shaggy", "unkempt", and "dirty." The previous year, noting the presence of the clean-cut Dale Murphy, Kruk himself described the team as "24 morons and one Mormon" (referring to Murphy). Their character endeared them to fans, and attendance reached a record high the following season. As a play on the legendary 1927 New York Yankees' Murderers' Row, the team's dirty, mullet-wearing look was dubbed "Macho Row." To the surprise of many, the Phillies powered their way to a 97–65 record and an East division title, powered by the team's 17–5 record in April. Each game brought a new hero, and the season was filled with odd and extraordinary games. The 1993 Phillies team was also noted for the close bond between the players and coaching staff.

The Phillies' major contributors on offense were OF Lenny Dykstra, 1B John Kruk, SS Kevin Stocker (a rookie who led the team in batting average, hitting .324), and OF Jim Eisenreich, all of whom hit over .300 for the season. Their pitching staff was led by 16-game winners Curt Schilling and Tommy Greene. Each member of the rotation posted at least 10 wins, while the bullpen was led by elder statesman Larry Andersen and closer Mitch "Wild Thing" Williams, who notched 43 saves and a 3.34 ERA.

=== Postseason ===
The Phillies beat the Atlanta Braves (the two-time defending National League champions) in the 1993 National League Championship Series, four games to two, to earn the fifth pennant in franchise history. Mitch Williams struck out Bill Pecota to end Game 6 by the score of 6–3. Curt Schilling with an 1.69 ERA and 19 strikeouts was named the NLCS MVP. They faced the defending World Series champion Toronto Blue Jays in the 1993 World Series, who beat the Chicago White Sox 4 games to 2 in the American League Championship Series.

Williams earned a save in Game 2 of the series, relieving Terry Mulholland as the Phillies tied the series at a game each. However, Williams suffered the loss in Game 4, the highest-scoring game in World Series history, as the Blue Jays came back from a 14–9 deficit, scoring six times in the eighth inning to earn a 15–14 victory and take a 3–1 series lead. It remains the highest scoring game in World Series history. Afterwards, Williams received death threats from angry Phillies fans for blowing the game.

After the Phillies won Game 5 in a complete-game shutout by Curt Schilling, the series returned to Toronto for Game 6.

== The setup ==
=== World Series Game 6 ===
The sixth game in the series was a rematch between Game 2 starters Terry Mulholland and Dave Stewart, who would have similar results. Toronto opened up the scoring in the bottom of the first with a run-scoring Paul Molitor triple, Joe Carter sacrifice fly, and Roberto Alomar RBI single. Molitor added a solo home run in the 5th inning, bringing the score to 5–1 for Toronto.

In the 7th inning, Philadelphia fought back with five runs to take a 6–5 lead. Lenny Dykstra hit a three-run home run (his fourth home run in the World Series), Dave Hollins had an RBI single and Pete Incaviglia hit a sacrifice fly. The inning brought an end to Dave Stewart's night, leaving the game with 6 innings pitched and 4 runs given up.

=== The play ===
With Philadelphia clinging to a 6–5 lead, closer Mitch Williams came on to pitch the bottom of the 9th. After beginning the inning by walking Rickey Henderson, perhaps the best base-runner ever, Williams tried to hold Henderson on base by using a slide-step style of pitching delivery. He had never before used such a delivery, and it may have slowed his pitches. Williams got Devon White to fly out, then gave up a single to Paul Molitor. Joe Carter came up next and, on a two-strike pitch, hit an inside pitch just over the left field fence for a three-run walk-off home run, giving the Blue Jays a come-from-behind 8–6 victory, and the World Series crown. Upon hitting the home run, Carter jumped up and down many times, most notably while rounding first base, where his helmet came off.

== The calls ==
- CBS Radio, with Vin Scully:

Fastball, it's hit to left field, down the line, in the corner, home run! Joe Carter, who took the 2 and 0 pitch for a strike right down the middle, hits the 2 and 1 (sic) pitch over the left field wall and the Toronto Blue Jays come back with 3 in the bottom of the ninth inning to become the World Champions yet again! The final score: Toronto 8, Philadelphia 6.

- CJCL-AM Radio in Toronto by Tom Cheek:

Joe has had his moments. Trying to lay off that ball, low to the outside part of the plate, he just went after one. Two balls and two strikes on him. Here's a pitch on the way, a swing and a belt, left field, way back, BLUE JAYS WIN IT! The Blue Jays are World Series champions, as Joe Carter hits a three-run home run in the ninth inning and the Blue Jays have repeated as World Series champions! Touch 'em all, Joe! You'll never hit a bigger home run in your life!

- WOGL-AM Radio in Philadelphia by Harry Kalas:

The 2–2 pitch, line drive in deep left, this ball is outta here. Three-run home run, Joe Carter, and the Toronto Blue Jays are the world champions of baseball for the second straight year. A three-run home run in the bottom of the ninth by Joe Carter who's being mobbed at home plate.

- CBS Television. Sean McDonough:

Now the 2-2. Well-hit down the left-field line, way back and GONE! Joe Carter with a three-run homer! The winners and still world champions, the Toronto Blue Jays!

== Aftermath ==
This was the last major North American professional sports championship won by a Canadian-based team until 2019, when the Toronto Raptors, a team that was formed in 1995, defeated the two-time defending champion Golden State Warriors in a six-game NBA Finals.

Williams later placed the blame on himself for what happened in the 1993 World Series, adding that he had put the ordeal behind him:

Everybody saw what happened,. . . . I made a mistake, and he hit the mistake. I let my team down today. I'm not going to go home and commit suicide or anything....They did what they had to do to win this series. And I let us down in big situations. I carry that burden. No excuses. I didn't get the job done.

—Mitch Williams on his feelings about surrendering the home run to Joe Carter.

Williams also said:

I'm not going to go home and commit suicide. . . . I wish I hadn't thrown it down and in to Carter. I was trying to keep the ball away from him. It was a mistake. . . . It ain't comin' back. . . . I can't replay it and win it. . . . I can't change this one, much as I'd like to, if only because my teammates busted their butts. I let 'em down. . . . But don't expect me to curl up and hide from people because I gave up a home run in the World Series. Life's a bitch. I could be digging ditches. I'm not.

—Mitch Williams on his feelings about surrendering the home run to Joe Carter

In 2011, 17 years after giving up the World Series home run, Williams said he regretted using the slide step when pitching to Carter. In a joint interview with Carter for the MLB Network's 20 Greatest Games series, Williams said he hadn't used the slide step before but was talked into doing so by pitching coach Johnny Podres after allowing a walk to base-stealing legend Rickey Henderson.

Williams had 102 lefty saves with the Phillies, but the Carter blast was the end of the line for him in Philadelphia. The Phillies traded him to the Houston Astros before the 1994 season. Williams never regained his form; he registered only two wins and six saves in his final three major-league seasons, with an ERA of 6.75 or above in all three. After two months with Houston in 1994, Williams closed out his major-league career with equally short stints with the California Angels in 1995 and the Kansas City Royals in 1997.

=== In popular culture ===
- In the 1999 Canadian hip hop single, "Let's Ride" by Choclair, one of the verses cites Carter's walk-off home run in the 1993 World Series, "It was the 9th inning, with two outs, I hit the home run to left field like Carter did to Philly". In actuality, there was only one out when Carter hit his home run.
- In the 1999 film Big Daddy, a plot twist at the end of the film revealed by Jon Stewart's character, Kevin Gerrity, is that he fathered a child conceived in Toronto as a by-product of celebrating Carter's walk-off home run to win the 1993 World Series, and later meeting a woman that same night while inebriated.
- In July 2015, Carter's walk-off home run celebration was used as the track artwork for the song "Back to Back" released by Toronto native Drake.
- At Little Canada, the moment is depicted in the replica of Rogers Centre in the Toronto section.

== See also ==
- Bill Mazeroski's 1960 World Series home run
