= Statue of Bill Mazeroski =

Sculpture in Pittsburgh, Pennsylvania

- Artist: Susan Wagner
- Year: 2010
- Medium: Bronze sculpture
- Subject: Bill Mazeroski
- Location: PNC Park Pittsburgh, Pennsylvania, U.S.

In 2010, the Pittsburgh Pirates unveiled a 14-foot, 2,000-pound statue of Baseball Hall of Fame second baseman Bill Mazeroski, commemorating the 50th anniversary of his walk-off home run in Game 7 of the 1960 World Series, one of the most iconic moments in baseball and sports history.

The statue, designed by artist Susan Wagner, stands outside PNC Park's right field gate. It depicts Mazeroski rounding second base, jumping for joy with his batting helmet in his right hand, after hitting the game-winning home run. Wagner modeled it after a photograph taken by James Klingensmith of the Pittsburgh Post-Gazette. Behind the sculpture is a small section of the original Forbes Field wall, over which Mazeroski homered that day.

Also next to the statue is a marker which describes the walk-off home run:

On October 13, 1960, Pirates second baseman William Stanley Mazeroski was the batter in the bottom of the 9th inning of Game 7 of the World Series at Forbes Field. The Pittsburgh Pirates were still battling the New York Yankees and the Series was tied at three games apiece. The score was tied 9-9. There were no outs with no one on base when Mazeroski stepped to the plate. On a 1-0 pitch at 3:36 p.m., Maz hit the only walk-off home run in Game 7 to win a World Series with a blast over the 406-foot sign on the outfield wall. This statue captures the moment when Bill Mazeroski rounded second base in celebration of one of the greatest moments in Pittsburgh sports history.

== See also ==
- Bill Mazeroski's 1960 World Series home run
