= Statue of Edward S. Rogers Jr. =

Sculpture in Toronto, Ontario, Canada

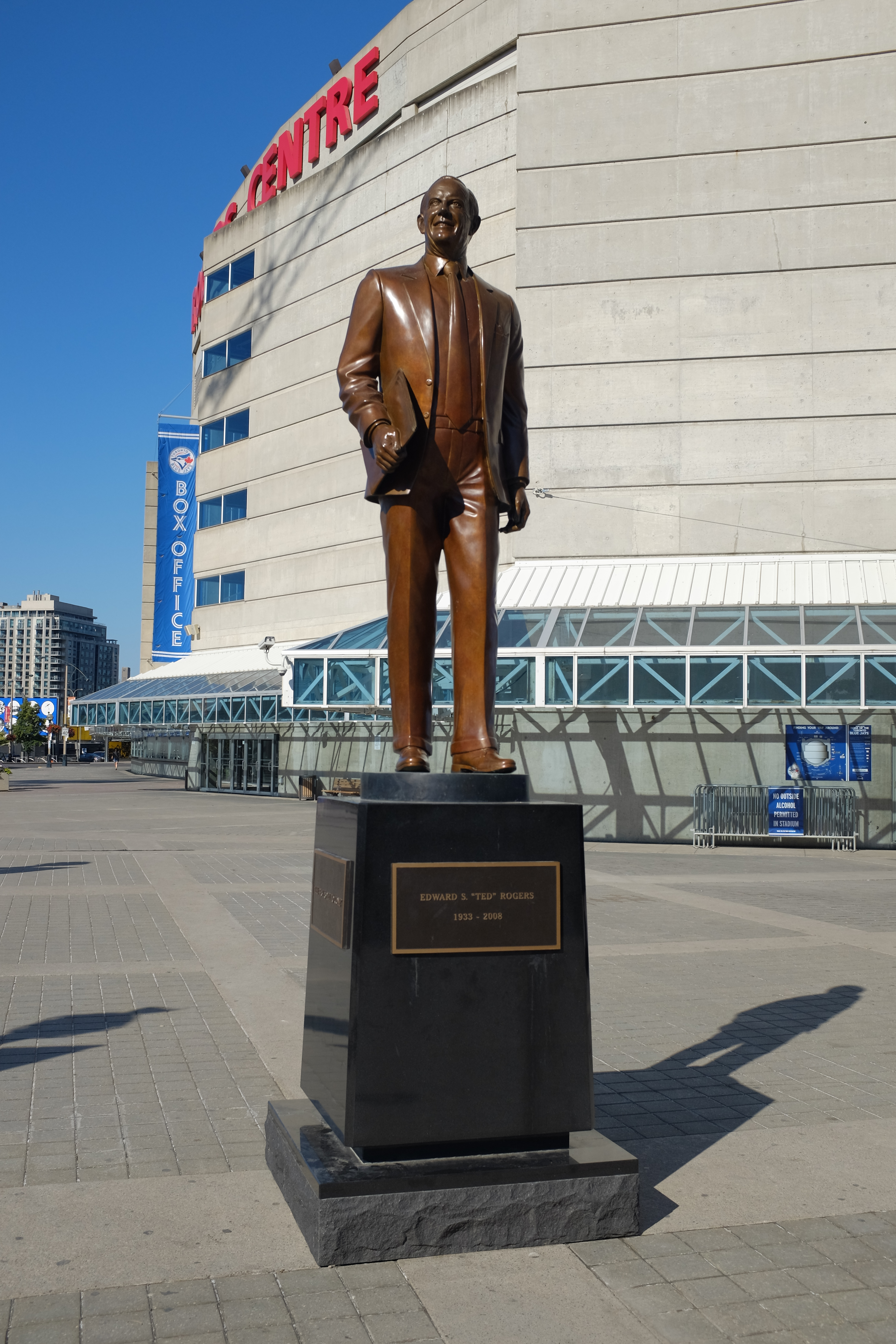
- The statue in 2014
- Medium: Bronze sculpture
- Subject: Edward S. Rogers Jr.
- Location: Toronto, Ontario, Canada; 43°38′29″N 79°23′14.8″W

From 2013–2026, a 12-foot bronze sculpture of Edward S. Rogers Jr. was placed outside Toronto's Rogers Centre, between Gates 5 and 6, in Ontario, Canada. Rogers was the founder of Rogers Communications, which purchased the Rogers Centre and Toronto Blue Jays in the early 2000s.

In February 2026 it was announced that the statue would be moved to Rogers corporate headquarters, and be replaced by a statue of Joe Carter's 1993 World Series home run. The new statue will be unveiled on 18 July 2026. On June 1, 2026, the statue was removed from outside Rogers Centre.
