= 1996 Major League Baseball All-Star Game =

1996 American baseball competition

	1	2	3	4	5	6	7	8	9	R	H	E
American League	0	0	0	0	0	0	0	0	0	0	7	0
National League	1	2	1	0	0	2	0	0	x	6	12	1
- Date: July 9, 1996
- Venue: Veterans Stadium
- City: Philadelphia
- Managers: Mike Hargrove (CLE); Bobby Cox (ATL)
- MVP: Mike Piazza (LA)
- Attendance: 62,670
- Ceremonial first pitch: Mike Schmidt, Richie Ashburn, Jim Bunning, Steve Carlton and Robin Roberts
- Television: NBC (United States); MLB International (International)
- TV announcers: Bob Costas, Joe Morgan and Bob Uecker (NBC); Gary Thorne and Ken Singleton (MLB International)
- Radio: CBS
- Radio announcers: John Rooney and Jim Hunter

The 1996 Major League Baseball All-Star Game was the 67th playing of the midsummer classic between the all-stars of the American League (AL) and National League (NL), the two leagues comprising Major League Baseball. The game was held on July 9, 1996, at Veterans Stadium in Philadelphia, the home of the Philadelphia Phillies of the National League. This marked the 15th and final All-Star Game appearance of Ozzie Smith, who retired after the 1996 season. Smith entered the game in the top of the sixth inning. His first at-bat was greeted by chants of "Oz-zie, Oz-zie" from the Philadelphia crowd. Iron Man Cal Ripken Jr., who was in the midst of his record-breaking run of consecutive games played, broke his nose during the pre-game AL team picture. However, he was ready to go at game time and started at SS.

During the pregame ceremonies, Kelsey Grammer of Frasier sang the American National Anthem and Canadian singer Sarah McLachlan sang the Canadian National Anthem. U.S. Congressman Jim Bunning (who was elected to the baseball hall-of-fame in 1996) joined other Phillies' hall of fame alumni Mike Schmidt, Steve Carlton, Richie Ashburn and Robin Roberts in tossing the ceremonial first pitches.

Joe Carter, the Toronto Blue Jays representative to the All-Star Game, received boos from the crowd for his home run that ended the 1993 World Series.

The game resulted in the National League defeating the American League 6–0. The National League would not win another All-Star Game until 2010.

Then-Chairman of the Executive Committee Bud Selig presented the All-Star Game MVP Award to Mike Piazza. Bobby Brown had presented the MVP Award in 1993, while National League President Len Coleman had presented the award in 1994 and 1995. After presenting the MVP Award at the 1998 Major League Baseball All-Star Game, Selig was officially named Commissioner of Baseball.

This is the only All-Star Game in which not a single pitcher walked a batter; appropriately, Braves closer Mark Wohlers was the final pitcher of the game.

This was the second and final time Veterans Stadium hosted the All-Star Game. It was also the last Midsummer Classic to be played on artificial turf (there are now five MLB stadiums with artificial turf, but all are of the next-generation variety), as well as being the last time the event was held in a multi-purpose stadium that was actively hosting both a Major League Baseball and a National Football League franchise. Philadelphia would not host the All-Star Game again until 2026, which took place at Citizens Bank Park.

== Rosters ==
Players in italics have since been inducted into the National Baseball Hall of Fame.

=== American League ===
Elected starters
Position	Player	Team	All-Star Games
C	Iván Rodríguez	Rangers	5
1B	Frank Thomas	White Sox	4
2B	Roberto Alomar	Orioles	7
3B	Wade Boggs	Yankees	12
SS	Cal Ripken Jr.	Orioles	14
OF	Albert Belle	Indians	4
OF	Ken Griffey Jr.	Mariners	7
OF	Kenny Lofton	Indians	3

Pitchers
Position	Player	Team	All-Star Games
P	Chuck Finley	Angels	4
P	Roberto Hernández	White Sox	1
P	José Mesa	Indians	2
P	Jeff Montgomery	Royals	3
P	Charles Nagy	Indians	2
P	Roger Pavlik	Rangers	1
P	Troy Percival	Angels	1
P	Andy Pettitte	Yankees	1
P	John Wetteland	Yankees	1

Reserves
Position	Player	Team	All-Star Games
C	Sandy Alomar Jr.	Indians	4
C	Dan Wilson	Mariners	1
1B	Mark McGwire	Athletics	8
1B	Mo Vaughn	Red Sox	2
2B	Chuck Knoblauch	Twins	3
3B	Travis Fryman	Tigers	4
SS	Alex Rodriguez	Mariners	1
OF	Brady Anderson	Orioles	2
OF	Jay Buhner	Mariners	1
OF	Joe Carter	Blue Jays	5
OF	Greg Vaughn	Brewers	2
DH	Edgar Martínez	Mariners	3

=== National League ===
Elected starters
Position	Player	Team	All-Star Games
C	Mike Piazza	Dodgers	4
1B	Fred McGriff	Braves	4
2B	Craig Biggio	Astros	5
3B	Matt Williams	Giants	4
SS	Barry Larkin	Reds	8
OF	Dante Bichette	Rockies	3
OF	Barry Bonds	Giants	6
OF	Tony Gwynn	Padres	12

Pitchers
Position	Player	Team	All-Star Games
P	Ricky Bottalico	Phillies	1
P	Kevin Brown	Marlins	2
P	Tom Glavine	Braves	4
P	Al Leiter	Marlins	1
P	Greg Maddux	Braves	5
P	Pedro Martínez	Expos	1
P	John Smoltz	Braves	4
P	Steve Trachsel	Cubs	1
P	Mark Wohlers	Braves	1
P	Todd Worrell	Dodgers	3

Reserves
Position	Player	Team	All-Star Games
C	Todd Hundley	Mets	1
C	Jason Kendall	Pirates	1
1B	Jeff Bagwell	Astros	2
2B	Eric Young	Rockies	1
3B	Ken Caminiti	Padres	2
3B	Chipper Jones	Braves	1
SS	Mark Grudzielanek	Expos	1
SS	Ozzie Smith	Cardinals	15
OF	Ellis Burks	Rockies	2
OF	Lance Johnson	Mets	1
OF	Henry Rodríguez	Expos	1
OF	Gary Sheffield	Marlins	3

== Game ==
=== Umpires ===
Home Plate	Randy Marsh (NL)
First Base	Larry McCoy (AL)
Second Base	Charlie Reliford (NL)
Third Base	Joe Brinkman (AL)
Left Field	Larry Poncino (NL)
Right Field	Chuck Meriwether (AL)

=== Starting lineups ===
American League				National League			
Order	Player	Team	Position	Order	Player	Team	Position
1	Kenny Lofton	Indians	CF	1	Lance Johnson	Mets	CF
2	Wade Boggs	Yankees	3B	2	Barry Larkin	Reds	SS
3	Roberto Alomar	Orioles	2B	3	Barry Bonds	Giants	LF
4	Albert Belle	Indians	LF	4	Fred McGriff	Braves	1B
5	Mo Vaughn	Red Sox	1B	5	Mike Piazza	Dodgers	C
6	Iván Rodríguez	Rangers	C	6	Dante Bichette	Rockies	RF
7	Cal Ripken Jr.	Orioles	SS	7	Chipper Jones	Braves	3B
8	Brady Anderson	Orioles	RF	8	Craig Biggio	Astros	2B
9	Charles Nagy	Indians	P	9	John Smoltz	Braves	P

=== Game summary ===
Tuesday, July 9, 1996 8:29 pm (ET) at Veterans Stadium in Philadelphia, Pennsylvania
Team	1	2	3	4	5	6	7	8	9	R	H	E
American League	0	0	0	0	0	0	0	0	0	0	7	0
National League	1	2	1	0	0	2	0	0	-	6	12	1
WP: John Smoltz (1–0) LP: Charles Nagy (0–1); Home runs: AL: None; NL: Ken Caminiti (1), Mike Piazza (1)
