= 1993 World Series =

90th edition of Major League Baseball's championship series

Team (Wins)	Managers	Season
Toronto Blue Jays (4)	Cito Gaston	95–67 (.586), GA: 7
Philadelphia Phillies (2)	Jim Fregosi	97–65 (.599), GA: 3
- Dates: October 16–23
- Venue(s): SkyDome (Toronto); Veterans Stadium (Philadelphia)
- MVP: Paul Molitor (Toronto)
- Umpires: Dave Phillips (AL, crew chief), Paul Runge (NL), Tim McClelland (AL), Charlie Williams (NL), Mark Johnson (AL), Dana DeMuth (NL)
- Hall of Famers: Blue Jays: Pat Gillick (GM); Roberto Alomar; Rickey Henderson; Paul Molitor; Jack Morris (DNP); Phillies: none

Broadcast
- Television: CBS, simulcast in Canada on CTV
- TV announcers: Sean McDonough and Tim McCarver
- Radio: CBS; CJCL (TOR); WOGL (PHI)
- Radio announcers: Vin Scully and Johnny Bench (CBS); Tom Cheek and Jerry Howarth (CJCL); Harry Kalas, Richie Ashburn, Chris Wheeler, Andy Musser and Garry Maddox (WOGL)
- ALCS: Toronto Blue Jays over Chicago White Sox (4–2)
- NLCS: Philadelphia Phillies over Atlanta Braves (4–2)

The 1993 World Series was the championship series of Major League Baseball's (MLB) 1993 season. The 90th edition of the World Series, it was a best-of-seven playoff played between the defending World Series champion and American League (AL) champion Toronto Blue Jays and the National League (NL) champion Philadelphia Phillies. The Blue Jays defeated the Phillies in six games, becoming the seventh franchise in MLB history to win back-to-back championships.

With Toronto ahead three games to two in the Series, but trailing Game 6 by a score of 6–5 in the bottom of the ninth inning, Joe Carter hit a game-winning three-run home run to clinch Toronto's second consecutive championship (the first team to repeat as champions since the 1977–78 Yankees).

This was only the second Series concluded by such a home run (the first was on a Bill Mazeroski home run for the Pittsburgh Pirates, in the bottom of the ninth in the seventh game of the 1960 World Series), and the first such occasion where a come-from-behind walk-off home run won a World Series. This victory was the last major North American professional sports championship won by a Canadian team until the Toronto Raptors won the 2019 NBA Finals.

This was the fourth World Series with games played entirely on artificial turf, following the series of 1980, 1985, and 1987. A fifth occurred in 2020, although that was a neutral-site series during the COVID-19 pandemic. The sixth would be the 2023 World Series.

Larry Andersen was the only member of the Phillies who had played for the team in its previous World Series appearance in 1983 (although he played for several other teams from 1986 to 1992). Darren Daulton had been a late season call-up in 1983, but only served as the bullpen catcher in the World Series that year.

To date, this remains Toronto's last World Series victory, as well as the most recent championship in any of the four major leagues to be won by a Canadian team at their home venue. The Jays would not return to the World Series until 32 years later, in 2025. They also did not return to the playoffs after 1993 until 2015.

== Summary ==
Nick Leyva, who was fired as the Phillies manager 13 games into the 1991 season after going 4–9, and replaced by Jim Fregosi, was the 3B coach for the Blue Jays. Leyva was the AAA Syracuse manager, but got the call up to the MLB staff after regular 3B coach Rich Hacker was badly injured in a car crash in July.

AL Toronto Blue Jays (4) vs. NL Philadelphia Phillies (2)

Game	Date	Score	Location	Time	Attendance
1	October 16	Philadelphia Phillies – 5, Toronto Blue Jays – 8	SkyDome	3:27	52,011
2	October 17	Philadelphia Phillies – 6, Toronto Blue Jays – 4	SkyDome	3:35	52,062
3	October 19	Toronto Blue Jays – 10, Philadelphia Phillies – 3	Veterans Stadium	3:16	62,689
4	October 20	Toronto Blue Jays – 15, Philadelphia Phillies – 14	Veterans Stadium	4:14	62,731
5	October 21	Toronto Blue Jays – 0, Philadelphia Phillies – 2	Veterans Stadium	2:53	62,706
6	October 23	Philadelphia Phillies – 6, Toronto Blue Jays – 8	SkyDome	3:27	52,195

== Matchups ==
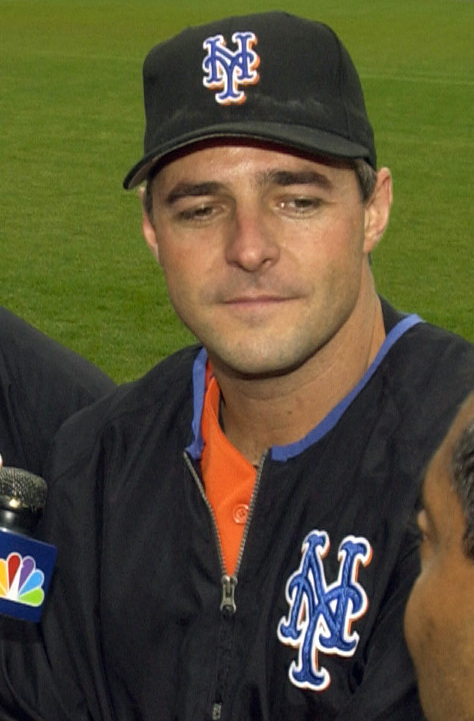
Al Leiter, the winning pitcher in Game 1.

=== Game 1 ===
Saturday, October 16, 1993 8:29 pm (EDT) at SkyDome in Toronto, Ontario 73 °F (23 °C), roof closed
Team	1	2	3	4	5	6	7	8	9	R	H	E
Philadelphia	2	0	1	0	1	0	0	0	1	5	11	1
Toronto	0	2	1	0	1	1	3	0	X	8	10	3
WP: Al Leiter (1–0) LP: Curt Schilling (0–1) Sv: Duane Ward (1); Home runs: PHI: None; TOR: Devon White (1), John Olerud (1)

The Series' first game sent two staff aces—Curt Schilling for Philadelphia and Juan Guzman for Toronto—against one another. The result was less than a pitcher's duel, however, as both teams scored early and often. The Philles struck first in the top of the first on RBI singles by John Kruk and Darren Daulton aided by two walks. In the bottom of the second, after two singles and a wild pitch, Paul Molitor's single and Tony Fernandez's groundout scored a run each to tie the game. The Phillies took a 3–2 lead in the third inning when Mariano Duncan hit a leadoff single, stole second and scored on Kruk's single, but the Blue Jays tied the game in the bottom half of the inning when Devon White reached third base on left fielder's Milt Thompson's error and scored on Joe Carter's sacrifice fly. The Phillies retook the lead in the fifth inning when Duncan tripled with one out and scored on a wild pitch, but White hit a home run to tie the game in the bottom of the inning. The next inning, John Olerud hit a home run to put Toronto on top 5–4. In the seventh, after two one-out singles, Schilling was relieved by David West, who allowed an RBI double to White and two-run double to Roberto Alomar to pad Toronto's lead to 8–4. The Phillies got a run in the ninth when Kruk hit a leadoff single, moved to second on an error and scored on Jim Eisenreich's two-out single, but Duane Ward got Ricky Jordan to fly out to end the game as Toronto won 8–5. Al Leiter pitched 2 2/3 innings—in relief of an erratic Juan Guzman, who walked four in just five innings—for his first World Series win. Kruk had three hits for Philadelphia. Alomar made an amazing diving catch on a Lenny Dykstra looper behind first in the top of the fifth.

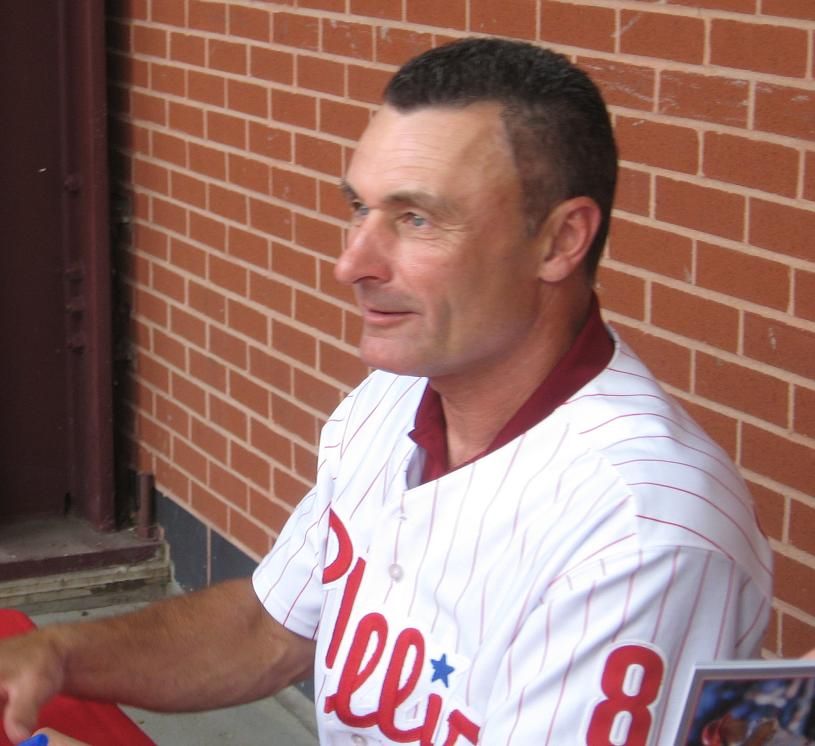
Jim Eisenreich hit a three-run home run for the Phillies in Game 2.

=== Game 2 ===
Sunday, October 17, 1993 8:29 pm (EDT) at SkyDome in Toronto, Ontario 73 °F (23 °C), roof closed
Team	1	2	3	4	5	6	7	8	9	R	H	E
Philadelphia	0	0	5	0	0	0	1	0	0	6	12	0
Toronto	0	0	0	2	0	1	0	1	0	4	8	0
WP: Terry Mulholland (1–0) LP: Dave Stewart (0–1) Sv: Mitch Williams (1); Home runs: PHI: Jim Eisenreich (1), Lenny Dykstra (1); TOR: Joe Carter (1)

In the second game of the Series, ALCS MVP Dave Stewart was on the mound for Toronto and Terry Mulholland started for Philadelphia. Philadelphia jumped out to an early lead: in the third inning, After two walks, John Kruk and Dave Hollins hit back-to-back RBI singles, then Jim Eisenreich followed with a three-run home run to deep right-center to put them up 5–0. Toronto got on the scoreboard in the fourth inning courtesy of a Joe Carter two-run home run to left, then cut the Phillies' lead to 5–3 in the sixth when Roberto Alomar singled with two outs and scored on Tony Fernandez's double, but the Phillies got that run back in the seventh on Lenny Dykstra's home run off Tony Castillo. Toronto cut the lead to 6–4 in the eighth when Paul Molitor hit a leadoff double off Roger Mason, stole third and scored on John Olerud's sacrifice fly off Mitch Williams. Alomar then walked and stole second, but was caught stealing third to end the inning. Williams then pitched a scoreless ninth as the Phillies won to tie the series. Mulholland pitched 5 2/3 innings, allowing three earned runs, for the win.

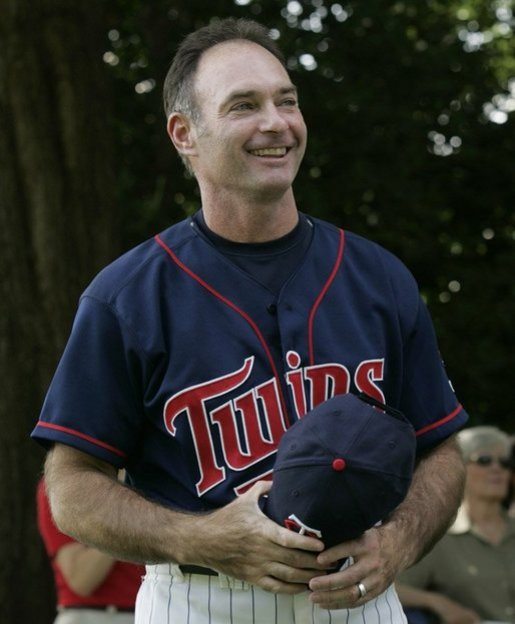
Paul Molitor hit a solo home run for the Blue Jays in a seven-run rout in Game 3.

=== Game 3 ===
Tuesday, October 19, 1993 8:12 pm (EDT) at Veterans Stadium in Philadelphia, Pennsylvania 58 °F (14 °C), intermittent Rain
Team	1	2	3	4	5	6	7	8	9	R	H	E
Toronto	3	0	1	0	0	1	3	0	2	10	13	1
Philadelphia	0	0	0	0	0	1	1	0	1	3	9	0
WP: Pat Hentgen (1–0) LP: Danny Jackson (0–1); Home runs: TOR: Paul Molitor (1); PHI: Milt Thompson (1)

The West Chester University "Incomparable" Golden Rams Marching Band performed the pregame show for Game 3.

As he had in the preceding World Series, when the 1993 edition moved into the National League ballpark Toronto manager Cito Gaston was faced with a decision regarding his designated hitter. In 1992, Dave Winfield was Gaston’s regular DH but in the three games the series was played in Atlanta, he inserted him into the lineup in his natural position of right field; in two of those games Gaston moved his regular right fielder, Joe Carter, to first base and kept John Olerud out of his lineup. This time, with Paul Molitor in his lineup, Gaston again had to decide whether or not to keep Olerud, who led the major leagues with a .363 batting average and was a good defensive first baseman, in the lineup or replace him with the veteran Molitor, who at this point in his career had mostly been a regular DH and could only play first base if needed. Against a left-handed pitcher, Gaston decided to stick with the right-handed veteran Molitor, but had left-hitting Olerud on the bench if needed later in the game.

The Blue Jays sent future Cy Young winner Pat Hentgen to the mound for Game 3. The Phillies countered with veteran Danny Jackson, who was one of the few Phillies that had pitched in a World Series; he was part of the 1985 Kansas City and 1990 Cincinnati teams that won World Series championships.

The Blue Jays struck for two runs before recording an out. After Rickey Henderson’s leadoff single and Devon White’s walk, Molitor tripled to drive them both in. Joe Carter then extended the Toronto lead to 3–0 with a sacrifice fly, but Jackson got out of the inning by retiring Roberto Alomar and Tony Fernandez.

The Phillies got two runners in scoring position with one out in their half of the first, with Mariano Duncan and John Kruk singling and an error by Carter enabling both runners to advance a base. Hentgen ended the threat by striking out Dave Hollins and Darren Daulton; the Phillies only got one more man on base before the sixth inning.

Molitor struck again with two out in the fourth, hitting a solo home run to extend the lead to four. Carter, Alomar, and Fernandez followed with singles to load the bases, but Jackson struck out Ed Sprague Jr. to end the inning without further damage. Jackson would be lifted for a pinch hitter in the fifth.

In the sixth, Phillies reliever Ben Rivera gave up a leadoff single to Alomar. With Fernandez up, the speedy second baseman stole second and third and scored on a sacrifice fly by his double-play partner. The Phillies got on the board in the bottom of the inning on a single by Jim Eisenreich that drove in Kruk. This was Hentgen’s last inning of work; Danny Cox would come on for the seventh.

In the top of the seventh, Henderson hit a leadoff double, then scored on a triple by White. After a walk by Molitor and a Carter strikeout, Alomar's RBI single made it 7–1 in favor of Toronto. Bobby Thigpen relieved Rivera and walked Fernandez before Sprague's sacrifice fly made it 8–1.

The Phillies managed a run off Cox in the seventh, with a string of singles by Milt Thompson, Lenny Dykstra, and Duncan with one out resulting in Thompson scoring. The Blue Jays finished their offensive output in the top of the ninth with an RBI triple by Alomar that scored Molitor and a single by Fernandez that followed to bring in Alomar. Thompson hit a solo home run against Toronto closer Duane Ward in the bottom of the ninth to finish out the scoring, and the Blue Jays emerged with a 10–3 victory and a two-games-to-one lead in the series.

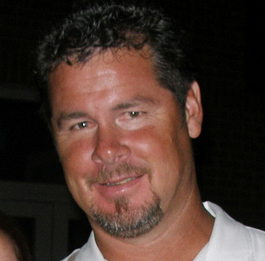
Mitch Williams surrendered the go-ahead run late in Game 4 and was charged with the loss.

=== Game 4 ===
Wednesday, October 20, 1993 8:12 pm (EDT) at Veterans Stadium in Philadelphia, Pennsylvania 62 °F (17 °C), overcast
Team	1	2	3	4	5	6	7	8	9	R	H	E
Toronto	3	0	4	0	0	2	0	6	0	15	18	0
Philadelphia	4	2	0	1	5	1	1	0	0	14	14	0
WP: Tony Castillo (1–0) LP: Mitch Williams (0–1) Sv: Duane Ward (2); Home runs: TOR: None; PHI: Lenny Dykstra 2 (3), Darren Daulton (1)

In the fourth game of the Series, Toronto sent Todd Stottlemyre to the mound while Philadelphia countered with Tommy Greene. It had been a rainy day in Philadelphia, which water-logged the aging turf at Veterans Stadium, making for particularly slippery conditions.

Toronto loaded the bases in the first on a double, walk and single. Paul Molitor walked to force in a run before Tony Fernandez's single scored two more. In the bottom half, three walks loaded the bases for the Phillies before Jim Eisenreich walked to force in a run, then Milt Thompson's three-run triple put the Phillies up 4–3. Lenny Dykstra's two-run home run next inning made it 6–3 Phillies. In the top of the third, after a one-out walk and single, consecutive RBI singles by Tony Fernandez and Pat Borders cut the lead to 6–5. Roger Mason relieved Greene and after a groundout and walk, Devon White's two-run single put Toronto up 7–6, but the Phillies tied the game in the fourth when Dykstra doubled with two outs off Al Leiter and scored on Mariano Duncan's single. Next inning, after a leadoff single, Darren Daulton's two-run home run put the Phillies up 9–7. After another single, Thompson's RBI double made it 10–7, then Dykstra's second home run of the game made it 12–7 Phillies.

In the sixth, White hit a leadoff double before scoring on Roberto Alomar's single off David West. After a single and hit-by-pitch loaded the bases, Fernandez's RBI groundout cut the Phillies' lead to 12–9, but they added a run in the bottom half when Dave Hollins hit a leadoff double off Tony Castillo and scored on Thompson's two-out single. Next inning, a hit-by-pitch to Daulton with the bases loaded made it 14–9 Phillies. In the eighth, though, after a one-out single and walk off Larry Andersen, Molitor's RBI double made it 14–10 Phillies. Fernandez then hit an RBI single off Mitch Williams. A walk loaded the bases, then after a strikeout, Rickey Henderson's single and White's triple scored two runs each to put Toronto ahead 15–14. Duane Ward earned the save, retiring the last four Phillies batters.

Three new World Series records were set, including the longest game (4:14), most total runs scored in a single game (29), and most runs scored by a losing team (14). Also, Charlie Williams became the first African American to serve as the home plate umpire for a World Series game.

Two death threats directed towards Mitch Williams were phoned into Veterans Stadium as soon as it became evident that Williams was going to be the losing pitcher of Game 4. Williams was not aware of the death threats until after Game 5.

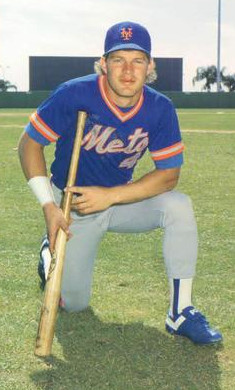
Lenny Dykstra scored the game-winning run for the Phillies that sent the series back to Toronto.

=== Game 5 ===
Thursday, October 21, 1993 8:12 pm (EDT) at Veterans Stadium in Philadelphia, Pennsylvania 67 °F (19 °C), Light rain
Team	1	2	3	4	5	6	7	8	9	R	H	E
Toronto	0	0	0	0	0	0	0	0	0	0	5	1
Philadelphia	1	1	0	0	0	0	0	0	X	2	5	1
WP: Curt Schilling (1–1) LP: Juan Guzmán (0–1)

The offenses were due for an off-day, and it came in Game 5 courtesy of a Curt Schilling (Philadelphia) and Juan Guzman (Toronto) pitching duel. With the Phillies' backs to the wall, Schilling shut down the previously unstoppable Toronto offense, limiting the team to just five hits, three walks, no extra-base hits (although catcher Pat Borders had two hits) and no runs in a complete-game shutout. It was only the second time all season that Toronto had been shut out. Guzman pitched well in a losing effort, allowing only two runs and five hits in seven innings of work.

The two runs scored as a result of scrappy baserunning play from the Philadelphia offense. In the first inning, Lenny Dykstra walked, stole second, moved to third on a Pat Borders throwing error during the steal, and scored on a John Kruk ground out. In the second inning, Darren Daulton opened with a double, took third on a groundout, and scored on a Kevin Stocker single.

As it turned out, it was the final postseason baseball game in Veterans Stadium. It was demolished after the 2003 season.

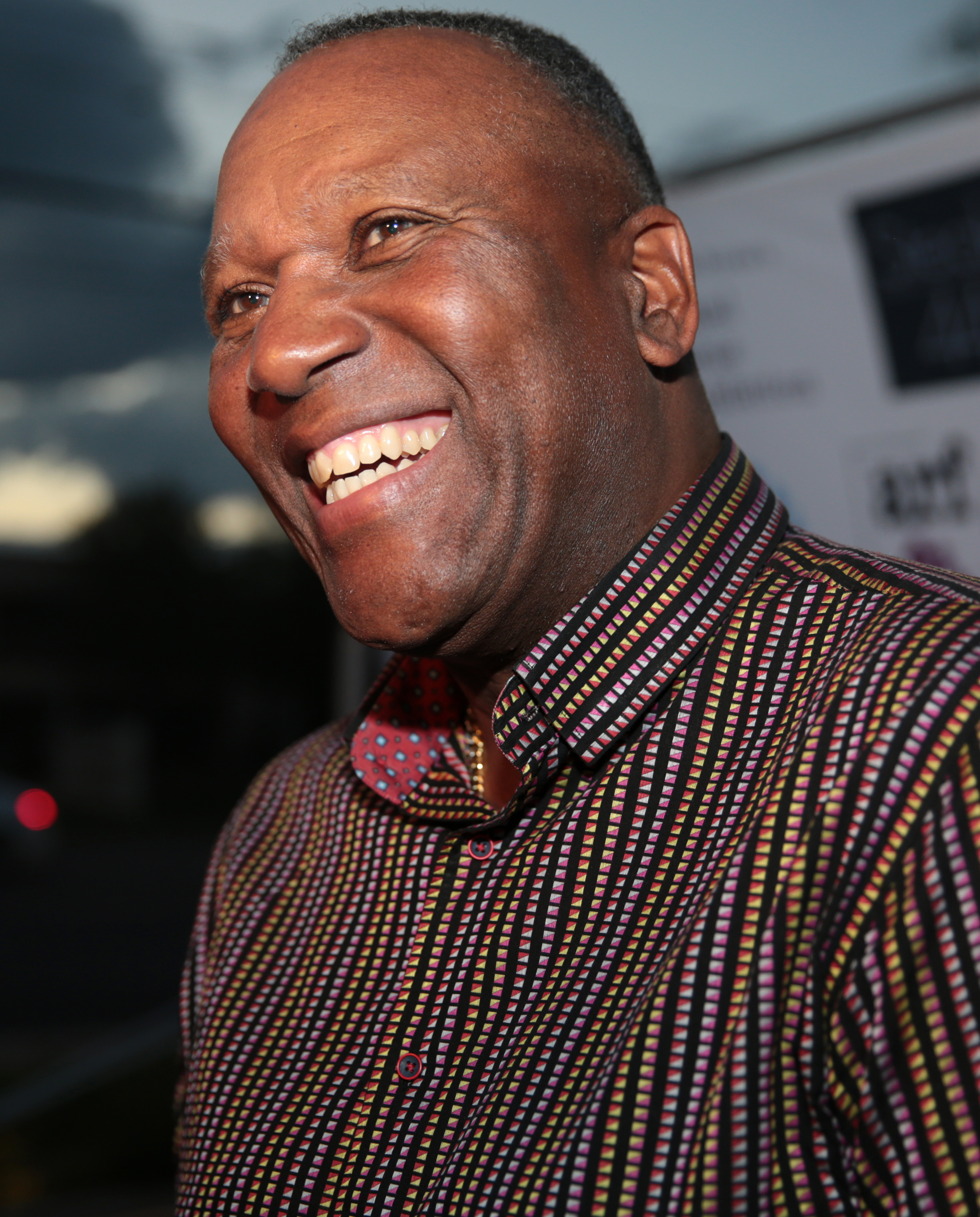
Joe Carter hit the game and series-winning walk-off home run in the bottom of the ninth inning to clinch the Blue Jays' second and most recent title.

=== Game 6 ===
Saturday, October 23, 1993 8:12 pm (EDT) at SkyDome in Toronto, Ontario 73 °F (23 °C), roof closed
Team	1	2	3	4	5	6	7	8	9	R	H	E
Philadelphia	0	0	0	1	0	0	5	0	0	6	7	0
Toronto	3	0	0	1	1	0	0	0	3	8	10	2
WP: Duane Ward (1–0) LP: Mitch Williams (0–2); Home runs: PHI: Lenny Dykstra (4); TOR: Paul Molitor (2), Joe Carter (2)

The sixth game in the Series was a rematch between Game 2 starters Terry Mulholland and Dave Stewart, who would have similar results. Toronto scored in the bottom of the first with a run-scoring Paul Molitor triple after a walk, Joe Carter sacrifice fly to score Molitor, and Roberto Alomar RBI single after a double. The Phillies got on the board in the fourth when Darren Daulton doubled with two outs and scored on Jim Eisenreich's single, but the Blue Jays got that run back in the bottom of the inning when Alomar hit a leadoff double, moved to third on a groundout and scored on Ed Sprague Jr.'s sacrifice fly. Paul Molitor added a home run in the fifth inning while the Toronto fans were chanting "MVP" for Paul, bringing the score to 5–1 for Toronto. Molitor became the first player in World Series history to have at least two home runs, two doubles, and two triples.

In the seventh inning, Philadelphia fought back with five runs. After a walk and single, Lenny Dykstra hit a three-run home run to knock Stewart out of the game. Mariano Duncan singled off reliever Danny Cox, stole second, and scored on Dave Hollins's RBI single to tie the game. A walk and single loaded the bases before Pete Incaviglia hit a sacrifice fly to put the Phillies up 6–5.

The Blue Jays would try to threaten in the bottom of the eighth. John Olerud drew a one-out walk and the Phillies brought in Larry Andersen to face Roberto Alomar. After Alomar grounded out, Andersen then hit Tony Fernandez with a pitch and walked Ed Sprague Jr. to load the bases. Andersen got out of the inning by inducing a pop-fly to Pat Borders. This became significant in the next inning, with the batting order reset to the top with Rickey Henderson leading off.

Philadelphia closer Mitch Williams came on to pitch the bottom of the ninth with his team clinging to a 6–5 lead. After beginning the inning by walking Rickey Henderson, Williams tried to counter Henderson's speed by using a slide-step style of pitching delivery. Prior to the game, Williams had never used the slide-step delivery in his career, and this may have cut back on his velocity. The walk to Henderson was followed by a Devon White flyout and a Paul Molitor single that moved Henderson to second.

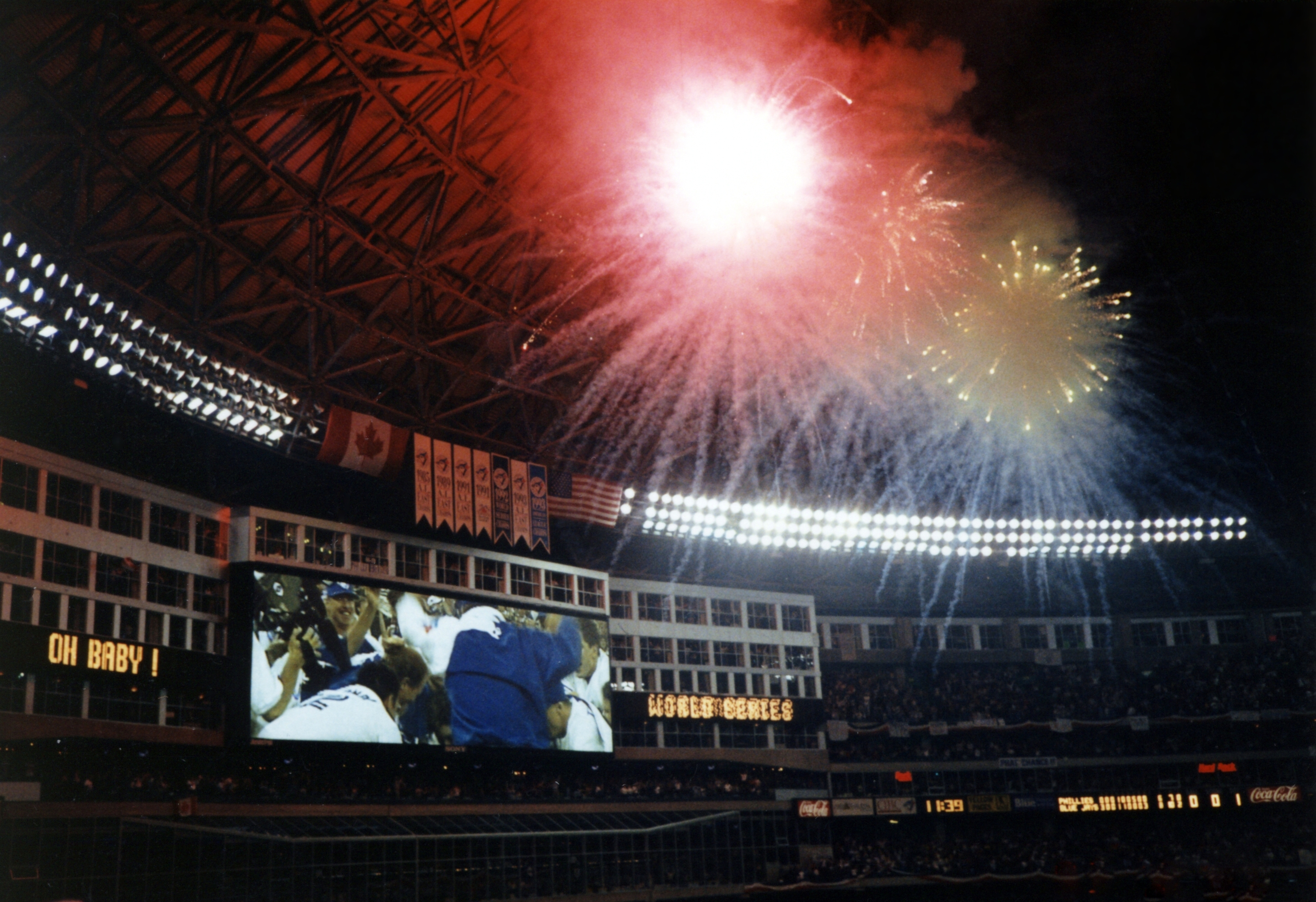
Fireworks in the SkyDome after Carter's home run.

Joe Carter came up next and, with the count 2–2, he hit a three-run home run to win the game and the World Series. Just before the fifth and final pitch to Joe Carter, CBS Sports announcer Tim McCarver commented that Carter (relatively unproductive in the Series to date) looked awkward and uncomfortable at the plate. The same pitch allowed Blue Jays radio announcer Tom Cheek the opportunity to utter his famous "Touch 'em all, Joe" quote, when Joe Carter clinched the series. Carter joined Bill Mazeroski as the only two players to win a World Series with a home run in the bottom of the ninth inning (Mazeroski hit his home run in the deciding Game 7, while Carter hit his in Game 6).

Carter was actively involved in the final play of the World Series for the second year in a row. In the previous year, Carter caught the final out as first baseman after relief pitcher Mike Timlin fielded Otis Nixon's bunt. Taking the 1993 ALCS into account (where he caught the final out in the outfield), he had been involved in the final play of three straight postseason championship series.

American League president Bobby Brown presented the World Series Trophy instead of the Commissioner of Baseball; this event also occurred in the year before.

== Composite box ==
1993 World Series (4–2): Toronto Blue Jays (A.L.) over Philadelphia Phillies (N.L.)

Team	1	2	3	4	5	6	7	8	9	R	H	E
Toronto Blue Jays	9	2	6	3	2	5	6	7	5	45	64	7
Philadelphia Phillies	7	3	6	2	6	2	8	0	2	36	58	2
Total attendance: 344,394 Average attendance: 57,399; Winning player's share: $127,921 Losing player's share: $91,222

== Aftermath ==
The Blue Jays became the second expansion team to win two World Series championships, following the New York Mets in 1986. This has since been achieved by the Florida Marlins in 2003, the Kansas City Royals in 2015, and the Houston Astros in 2022. With the Montreal Canadiens winning the 1993 Stanley Cup Final five months earlier, it marked the only time Canadian teams won multiple league championships among the four major North American team sports in a calendar year.

Mitch Williams would later place blame on himself for the World Series loss:

Everybody saw what happened,. . . . I made a mistake, and he hit the mistake. I let my team down today. I'm not going to go home and commit suicide or anything....They did what they had to do to win this series. And I let us down in big situations. I carry that burden. No excuses. I didn't get the job done.

—Mitch Williams on his feelings about surrendering the home run to Joe Carter. Williams would be traded that off-season by the Phillies to the Astros.

Roger Angell's review of the World Series in The New Yorker was entitled "Oh, What a Lovely War".

When Joe Carter appeared in the 1996 All-Star Game at Veterans Stadium, he was booed by the crowd for his aforementioned home run that won him this World Series.

Both teams would experience absences from the postseason; the Phillies did not return to the postseason until 2007, or appear in another World Series until their championship season of 2008, bringing the city of Philadelphia its first championship since the 76ers swept the 1983 NBA Finals. The general manager of the Blue Jays, Pat Gillick, was general manager of the Phillies team that won the 2008 World Series. The Blue Jays did not qualify for the playoffs again until the 2015 season. This was the last time a Toronto team made it to the championship round in one of the four major sports until the Toronto Raptors in their 2019 championship season. The Blue Jays would not return to the World Series until 2025, when they ultimately lost to the Los Angeles Dodgers in a seven-game thriller.

By accumulating 45 runs over the course of the series, the Blue Jays scored the highest number of runs of any series-winning team in World Series history. Only the series-losing 1960 New York Yankees accumulated more runs in a series (55). Coincidentally, that series also ended on a walk-off home run.

1993 was the last postseason played under a two-division, two post-season round format. After the season, MLB owners agreed to a new three-division setup, with extra post-season round (League Division Series). The extra round format had been used once before during the 1981 strike shortened season.

== Broadcasting ==
CBS Sports covered the World Series on television for the fourth consecutive year; it was also the final World Series in CBS's contract to air Major League Baseball games. For the second consecutive year, Sean McDonough served as lead announcer, with Tim McCarver serving as analyst for the fourth consecutive year. Pregame and postgame shows saw Andrea Joyce and Pat O'Brien as hosts, while Lesley Visser and Jim Gray were field level reporters.

CBS Radio was once again the nationwide radio partner (in the US) for the World Series. Vin Scully led the broadcast for a fourth consecutive year, with Johnny Bench serving as analyst for the fifth and last time. John Rooney served as the pregame and postgame show host.

The game was heard on radio throughout Canada on a series of stations picking up the feed of CJCL-AM in Toronto, with the game being called by Jerry Howarth and Tom Cheek. Cheek's famous call of the Carter home run ("Touch 'em all Joe, you'll never hit a bigger home run in your life!") lives on in Blue Jays folklore. Tom Cheek never called another postseason game in his role as voice of the Blue Jays, from which he retired in 2005 prior to his death from brain cancer.

Locally in Philadelphia, the World Series was called on WOGL-AM by Harry Kalas, Richie Ashburn, Chris Wheeler, Andy Musser, and Garry Maddox.

The 1993 series was Richie Ashburn's last as a Phillies broadcaster, as he died in 1997. Andy Musser also called his last World Series as a member of the Phillies' broadcast team; he retired in 2001 and died eleven years later. Game six also marked Johnny Bench's final broadcast for CBS Radio after nine years (he would be replaced on CBS Radio's World Series broadcasts by Jeff Torborg), while Harry Kalas would not call another World Series until 2008. Kalas later died in 2009 prior to a game at Nationals Park in Washington, D.C. Chris Wheeler continued to call games for the Phillies until being released in 2014 and Jerry Howarth continued to call Blue Jays games, moving into the primary play-by-play position following the death of Cheek, until his retirement before the 2018 season. Howarth would return to call postseason games when the Blue Jays qualified in 2015 and 2016, where they were eliminated in the ALCS both years.

=== The Joe Carter home run calls ===
- CBS Radio, with Vin Scully:

Fastball, it's hit to left field, down the line, in the corner, home run! Joe Carter, who took the 2 and 0 pitch for a strike right down the middle, hits the 2 and 1 (sic) pitch over the left field wall and the Toronto Blue Jays come back with 3 in the bottom of the ninth inning to become the World Champions yet again. The final score: Toronto 8, Philadelphia 6.

- CJCL-AM Radio in Toronto by Tom Cheek:

Joe has had his moments. Trying to lay off that ball, low to the outside part of the plate, he just went after one. Two balls and two strikes on him. Here's a pitch on the way, a swing and a belt, left field, way back... BLUE JAYS WIN IT! The Blue Jays are World Series champions, as Joe Carter hits a three-run home run in the ninth inning and the Blue Jays have repeated as World Series champions! Touch 'em all, Joe! You'll never hit a bigger home run in your life!

- WOGL-AM Radio in Philadelphia by Harry Kalas:

The 2–2 pitch, line drive in deep left, this ball is outta here. Three-run home run, Joe Carter, and the Toronto Blue Jays are the world champions of baseball for the second straight year. A three-run home run in the bottom of the ninth by Joe Carter who's being mobbed at home plate.

- CBS Television. Sean McDonough:

Now the 2-2. Well-hit down the left-field line, way back and GONE! Joe Carter with a three-run homer! The winners and still world champions, the Toronto Blue Jays!

== In popular culture ==
Toronto rapper Choclair refers to Joe Carter's walk-off home run in his 1999 song, "Let's Ride".

On July 29, 2015, Toronto rapper Drake released a diss track against Philadelphia rapper Meek Mill entitled "Back to Back". The cover of the diss track features a picture of Joe Carter, just after hitting the series-clinching home run.

== See also ==
- 1993 Japan Series

== Sources ==
- Forman, Sean L. "1993 World Series". Baseball-Reference.com – Major League Statistics and Information. Archived from the original on November 30, 2007.
