= Ed Sprague Jr. =

American baseball player (born 1967)

- Third baseman
- Born: July 25, 1967 (age 58); Castro Valley, California, U.S
- Batted: Right Threw: Right

MLB debut
- May 8, 1991, for the Toronto Blue Jays

Last MLB appearance
- October 7, 2001, for the Seattle Mariners

MLB statistics
- Batting average: .247
- Home runs: 152
- Runs batted in: 558
- Stats at Baseball Reference

Teams
- Toronto Blue Jays (1991–1998); Oakland Athletics (1998); Pittsburgh Pirates (1999); San Diego Padres (2000); Boston Red Sox (2000); San Diego Padres (2000); Seattle Mariners (2001)

Career highlights and awards
- All-Star (1999); 2× World Series champion (1992, 1993)
Medals
Men's baseball
Representing United States
Pan American Games
Silver medal – second place	1987 Indianapolis	Team
Olympic Games
Gold medal – first place	1988 Seoul	Team
Baseball World Cup
Silver medal – second place	1988 Rome	Team
World Junior Baseball Championship
Silver medal – second place	1985 Albany	Team

Edward Nelson Sprague Jr. (born July 25, 1967) is an American former Major League Baseball third baseman. He played 11 seasons in the major leagues from 1991 to 2001, with six different teams. He later served as the head baseball coach of the NCAA's Pacific Tigers for 12 seasons, from 2004 to 2015. He is now the Athletics Director of Player Development. Sprague is the only baseball player ever to win the College World Series, an Olympic championship, and the World Series. He is also the only baseball player to win the College World Series two consecutive seasons and the World Series two consecutive seasons.

== College career and Olympics ==
In college Sprague played third base, helping Stanford win College World Series championships in 1987 and 1988. In 1986, he played collegiate summer baseball with the Cotuit Kettleers of the Cape Cod Baseball League. He collected an Olympic gold medal at the 1988 Summer Olympics on the men's baseball team. Because baseball was a demonstration sport that year, however, the medals were unofficial and did not count towards respective countries' medal counts.

Sprague is a member of Delta Tau Delta International Fraternity. He was drafted in the first round of the 1988 Major League Baseball draft by the Toronto Blue Jays.

== Major league career ==
Sprague made his debut in 1991 for the Toronto Blue Jays and was a part of the 1992 and 1993 World Series championships. He hit the game-winning home run in the ninth inning of Game 2 of the 1992 Series against the Atlanta Braves. His best individual year came in 1996 when he hit .247 with 36 home runs and 101 runs batted in.

Sprague was a regular with Toronto until 1998, when he was traded to the Oakland Athletics. He was granted free agency at the end of 1998, and then played for the Pittsburgh Pirates in 1999, for which he made his only All-Star game appearance. That year, he hit .267 with 22 homers, 81 RBI and a .352 on-base percentage, the best of his career as a regular player. In 2000, Sprague played for the San Diego Padres and Boston Red Sox. After becoming a free agent at the end of the year, he signed with the Seattle Mariners for the 2001 season, playing in 45 regular season games. He signed a minor league contract with the Texas Rangers in early 2002, but did not return to the major leagues.

Sprague twice led the league in getting hit by pitches and finished with a career total of 91. Sprague is the only baseball player ever to win championships in the College World Series, the Olympics, and the World Series. Sprague's final career totals include 1203 games played, 506 runs, 1010 hits, 225 doubles, 12 triples, 152 home runs, 558 runs batted in, a .247 batting average, a .318 on-base average, and a .419 slugging average. According to a report in the Stockton Record, Sprague said he used performance-enhancing substances later banned by Major League Baseball and admitted hitting a home run with a corked bat.

== Coaching career ==
Sprague was the head coach of the Pacific Tigers college baseball team from the 2004 season until he resigned following the 2015 season. In 2016, Sprague returned to Major League Baseball as a Special Assistant to the General Manager of the Oakland Athletics. He was named Director of Player Development following the 2019 season.

== Personal life ==
Sprague's wife, Kristen Babb-Sprague, is an Olympic gold medalist in synchronized swimming. Sprague's father, Ed Sr., pitched in the majors from 1968 through 1976.

== Head coaching record ==
Below is a table of Sprague's yearly records as an NCAA head baseball coach.

Statistics overview
Season	Team	Overall	Conference	Standing	Postseason
Pacific Tigers (Big West Conference) (2004–2013)
2004	Pacific	20–34	5–16	T–7th	
2005	Pacific	30–28	9–12	6th	
2006	Pacific	30–25	9–12	T–5th	
2007	Pacific	16–43	3–18	T–7th	
2008	Pacific	14–41	5–19	9th	
2009	Pacific	21–32	9–15	7th	
2010	Pacific	31–23	12–12	4th	
2011	Pacific	17–37	9–15	8th	
2012	Pacific	16–40	6–18	9th	
2013	Pacific	15–39	7–20	9th	
Pacific Tigers (West Coast Conference) (2014–2015)
2014	Pacific	26–27	15–12	6th	
2015	Pacific	14–37	10–17	9th	
Pacific:		250–406	99–186		
Total:		250–406			
National champion Postseason invitational champion Conference regular season champion Conference regular season and conference tournament champion Division regular season champion Division regular season and conference tournament champion Conference tournament champion

== See also ==
- List of second-generation Major League Baseball players
