= Bill Mazeroski =

American baseball player (1936–2026)

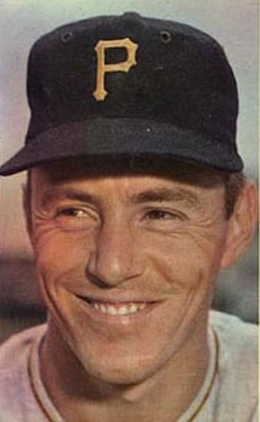
- Mazeroski with the Pittsburgh Pirates in 1959
- Second baseman
- Born: September 5, 1936; Wheeling, West Virginia, U.S.
- Died: February 20, 2026 (aged 89); Lansdale, Pennsylvania, U.S.
- Batted: Right Threw: Right

MLB debut
- July 7, 1956, for the Pittsburgh Pirates

Last MLB appearance
- October 4, 1972, for the Pittsburgh Pirates

MLB statistics
- Batting average: .260
- Hits: 2,016
- Home runs: 138
- Runs batted in: 853
- Stats at Baseball Reference

Teams
- Pittsburgh Pirates (1956–1972)

Career highlights and awards
- 10× All-Star (1958–1960², 1962–1964, 1967); 2× World Series champion (1960, 1971); 8× Gold Glove Award (1958, 1960, 1961, 1963–1967); Pittsburgh Pirates No. 9 retired; Pittsburgh Pirates Hall of Fame

Member of the National

Baseball Hall of Fame
- Induction: 2001
- Election method: Veterans Committee

William Stanley Mazeroski (September 5, 1936 – February 20, 2026), nicknamed "Maz" and "the Glove", was an American second baseman in Major League Baseball (MLB) who played his entire career for the Pittsburgh Pirates from 1956 to 1972. A ten-time All-Star known during his career primarily for his spectacular defensive play, he came to be known best for one of the most memorable home runs in baseball history, a dramatic ninth-inning drive in Game 7 of the 1960 World Series that beat the favored New York Yankees. It was the first time that the major league season ended with a home run, and remains the only walk-off home run to clinch a World Series championship in Game 7. ESPN ranked the World Series winner at the top of its list of the 100 Greatest Home Runs of All Time, while Sports Illustrated had it eighth in its compilation of the 100 Greatest Moments in Sports History. Mazeroski received the Babe Ruth Award for his play in the Series, during which he batted .320.

An eight-time Gold Glove Award winner, Mazeroski was particularly noted for his ability to make the pivot in turning double plays. His 1,706 career double plays remain a major league record for a second baseman, and were the most by any non-first baseman in history until shortstop Omar Vizquel passed him in 2009. Mazeroski led the National League (NL) in double plays for eight consecutive years, and recorded over 100 double plays eleven times, both also major league records. His 161 double plays in 1966 remain the major league record for second basemen; when he retired, he held the top three marks in NL history. He led the major leagues in assists a record nine times, and led the NL in putouts five times and in fielding percentage three times. Mazeroski set NL records for career games (2,094), putouts (4,974), assists (6,685), and total chances (11,863) by a second baseman, all of which were later broken by Joe Morgan; his career fielding percentage of .983 ranked second in NL history when he retired, less than a quarter of a point behind Red Schoendienst.

Mazeroski also provided contributions on offense which were not typical for his position; his 138 career home runs and 853 runs batted in (RBI) were the most by any second baseman during the period between 1944 and 1974, with his home run total putting him behind only Rogers Hornsby among NL second basemen when his career ended. His home run production was particularly notable due to Pittsburgh's cavernous home stadium, where the distant reaches in left and center field made it typically the league's most difficult home run stadium until the mid-1960s.

Mazeroski closed out his career by helping the Pirates to three consecutive division titles; he and Roberto Clemente were the only members of the 1960 champions who were on the team when they picked up another title in 1971, beating the favored Baltimore Orioles in seven games. Mazeroski later became a coach for the Pirates and the Seattle Mariners. The Pirates organization retired his uniform number in 1987. Mazeroski was inducted into the National Baseball Hall of Fame in 2001.

== Early life and education ==
Mazeroski was born in Wheeling, West Virginia, to Mayme and Louis Mazeroski who lived in nearby Witch Hazel, Ohio. The Mazeroskis are Polish American. Louis Mazeroski had been a highly regarded baseball prospect—he once had a tryout with the Cleveland Indians—but a severed foot suffered in a coal mine accident ruined his dream as well as his livelihood. Along with his parents and sister Mary, Bill Mazeroski grew up in a small one-room house that was devoid of electricity and indoor plumbing. He often went by the name of Catfish because of a penchant for fishing, which he took up out of necessity.

Louis Mazeroski became prone to alcohol, but he did not want his son to follow him to the coal mines. The two played catch and talked ball regularly. As family legend had it, Bill's father purchased his glove with the pay from digging out an outhouse. Their favorite drill involved Louis bouncing a tennis ball against a brick wall for Bill to field. The exercise was designed to sharpen hand-eye coordination and ability to quickly adjust to bad bounces, areas in which Bill excelled as early as elementary school. As a child, Bill was a fan of the Cleveland Indians and counted Lou Boudreau, Bob Feller, Ken Keltner, and Joe Gordon as being among his heroes.

Bill Mazeroski attended Warren Consolidated High School in Tiltonsville, Ohio, where he was a multi-sports star, most notably in baseball and basketball. He was a four-year starter with the varsity baseball team, normally as a shortstop or pitcher. In his senior year, he was named Class A 2nd team All-Ohio in basketball.

Mazeroski turned down college scholarship offers from Duquesne University, Ohio State and West Virginia to pursue a professional baseball career. In 1954, after several major league teams had courted the infielder, the Indians, Boston Red Sox, Chicago White Sox, and Philadelphia Phillies among them, the 17-year-old finally chose the Pirates, largely because they agreed to accelerate his start in Class-A ball unlike the others.

In July 1957, Mazeroski enlisted with fellow player Buddy Pritchard in the U.S. Army Reserve, serving in the 773rd Artillery Battalion.

== Professional career ==
=== Early struggles and rapid ascent ===
Success at the pro level did not come easily for Mazeroski at the outset. In 1955, the 17-year-old made his debut with the Class A Williamsport Grays, where he hit .235 in 93 games. He played exclusively at shortstop, where he was charged with 31 errors. The next spring, Pirates general manager Branch Rickey noticed how well he turned the double play as a second baseman, which prompted his move to the right side of the diamond. Mazeroski moved up to the Triple A Hollywood Stars farm club to begin the 1955 season. While he played 20 error-less games at his new position, the two-level jump proved to be too much at the plate. He was sent back to Williamsport, where he got back on track with a .293 batting average and 11 homers in 114 games.

Mazeroski returned to the Hollywood Stars at the outset of the 1956 campaign, only this time things were noticeably different. He hit .306 with an .823 OPS (on-base plus slugging) to earn a promotion to the major leagues midway through the season. At a time when the vast majority of young athletes were required to hone their skills in the minors for several years, Mazeroski got the call at 19 years of age. As expected, the transition was not a seamless one.

He made his first major league appearance on July 7, 1956, against the New York Giants at the Polo Grounds in New York. His first hit was a single off Johnny Antonelli in his first at bat. But for most of the next five weeks, his batting average tumbled below the .200 mark. He hit his first home run on August 16, a 2-run shot off Robin Roberts, but a few days later, Pirates manager Bobby Bragan dropped him behind the pitcher in the batting order for 10 games. Mazeroski regrouped to hit .243 in 81 games, but later said that the drop in the lineup hurt his confidence.

After Danny Murtaugh replaced Bragan at the helm in early August 1957, Mazeroski and the Pirates showed immediate and steady improvement. In its 1958 preseason analysis, Sports Illustrated reported that he was seen as potentially "the finest young infielder in the business." In 1958, the young Bucs promptly stunned the baseball world with a second-place finish, while Mazeroski blossomed into an All-Star for the first time in his career. His 19 home runs and 69 RBI each ranked second at his position in the major leagues. He also was selected for his first Gold Glove Award. His father Louis died of lung cancer early the next year.

=== The home run of all home runs ===
On the heels of a subpar season for Mazeroski and his fourth-place team, the 1960 campaign exceeded the wildest dreams of Pittsburgh sports fans. The Battlin' Bucs, as they would become known, dominated the National League virtually from the start to claim their first pennant since the 1927 season. Meanwhile, Mazeroski was an NL starter in both All-Star Games. (Note: Major League Baseball held two All-Star Games for the years from 1959 to 1962.)

The Pirates seized control of the pennant race in August, when they won 21 of 31 games with Mazeroski in a lead role. He hit .373, drove in 16 runs and had a 26-game errorless streak in the month. The team was rewarded with a trip to the 1960 World Series, where the second baseman forged his legacy against the New York Yankees with a pair of game-winning home runs. The second came on October 13 off reliever Ralph Terry at Forbes Field, the only homer to end a World Series in major league history until 1993. One of the wildest games in baseball history got wilder yet in the top of the ninth inning, when the Yankees plated two runs to forge a 9–9 deadlock. At that point, Mazeroski admittedly got caught up in the sudden turn of events. It seemed the second baseman had forgotten that he was to lead off the bottom half of the inning, and it wasn't until first base coach Lenny Levy reminded him of the fact that he hurriedly picked up a bat.

At precisely 3:36 p.m. local time, on a 1-0 count, Mazeroski slammed Terry's high fastball just to the left of the 406-foot marker in distant left-center field. "Here's a swing and a high fly ball going deep to left! This may do it!" NBC Radio broadcaster Chuck Thompson told the national audience. "Back to the wall goes (Yogi) Berra... It is over the fence -home run! The Pirates win! .. Ladies and gentlemen, Mazeroski has hit a one-nothing pitch over the left field fence at Forbes Field to win the 1960 World Series for the Pittsburgh Pirates!"

The home run gave the Pirates their first World Series championship in 35 years and was followed by celebrations in Pittsburgh.

"I was almost at second base when (the ball) finally went over," Mazeroski said. "I was running so hard, just trying to make sure I'd get to third. Then it took a moment or two to realize what happened - it was gone." At that point, Mazeroski finished his sprint around the bases like a giddy schoolboy before he was mobbed at home plate. "You know, all I could think about was, "We beat the Yankeesǃ We beat themǃ We beat the damn Yankeesǃ" he said.

Andy Jerpe, 14, retrieved the ball amid the cherry trees in Schenley Park, which was adjacent to the ballpark. After taking pictures with the ball for the gathered press, Mazeroski signed the ball for him in the clubhouse and told him, "Keep it. The memory's good enough for me," but the keepsake was lost during a neighborhood game a short time later.

The Game 7 homer marked the third game-winning hit for Mazeroski in the series. In the fourth inning of Game 1, with Don Hoak on base, he hit a two-run homer off reliever Jim Coates that cleared the large scoreboard in straight-away left field. The blow extended Pittsburgh's lead to 5–2 and proved to be the difference in a 6–4 victory. In Game 5, Mazeroski rapped a two-run double to left field off Art Ditmar that scored Hoak and Gino Cimoli in the fourth inning. The hit gave his team a 3–0 advantage that held up in a 5–2 triumph. Even though Mazeroski hit .320 with team highs of five RBI, four runs scored, and two home runs, Yankees counterpart Bobby Richardson was selected the Most Valuable Player of the series.

In September 2010, a statue of Mazeroski was unveiled outside PNC Park in Pittsburgh, depicting his legendary home run celebration—a runner pose with both arms extended, ball cap in right hand. The home run was ranked number 2 on The Sporting News' list of "Baseball's 25 Greatest Moments. In 2020, writing for The Athletic, sportswriter Joe Posnanski ranked the home run at number 8 in his series of "60 moments", a list of the most memorable moments in baseball history.

=== Later career ===
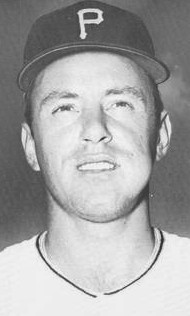
Mazeroski in 1965

In 1961, Mazeroski recorded 144 double plays, breaking the NL record of 137 shared by Jackie Robinson and Red Schoendienst. On April 28, 1966, Mazeroski became the second NL player to hit 100 home runs as a second baseman when he took Chicago Cubs starter Ferguson Jenkins deep in a 9–6, 10-inning road win. Later that year, he shattered Jerry Priddy's single-season major league record of 150 double plays at second base, which was set with the Detroit Tigers in the 1950 campaign. In 1967, Mazeroski broke Schoendienst's NL record of 1,368 career double plays. On August 19, 1968, in an 8–3 road loss to the Cincinnati Reds, he broke Schoendienst's league record of 1,834 games at second base. In 1969, he broke Frankie Frisch's NL record of 6,026 assists and Billy Herman's league record of 10,815 total chances; in 1970, he broke Nellie Fox's major league record of 1,619 double plays, and Herman's NL record of 4,780 putouts.

In the second game of a doubleheader on June 28, 1970, in the final game played at Forbes Field, Mazeroski fielded a Don Kessinger ground ball near second base and stepped on the bag to force out Willie Smith for the final out in a 4–1 victory over the Cubs. On July 16, he fielded the first batted ball in the history of Three Rivers Stadium, a ground ball off the bat of Ty Cline that opened a 3–2 loss to the Reds. On August 17, 1971, Mazeroski doubled in the second inning of a 6–5 loss to the Houston Astros for his 2,000th career hit. On July 23, 1972, against the Reds, he singled in the first inning of a 3–2 win; it was the last regular-season hit of his career, as he went hit-less in his final 30 at bats as his playing time was gradually reduced to occasional pinch hitting.

At the end of his career, Mazeroski ranked fourth in Pirates history in games played (2,163), fifth in home runs (138) and at bats (7,755), sixth in RBI (853) and doubles (294), and seventh in hits (2,016) and total bases (2,848). Modern sabermetrics credit him with 27.6 Wins Above Replacement (WAR) in the 1960s, the most of any major leaguer at his position. Joe Morgan broke Mazeroski's NL record for games at second base on September 28, 1980, his record for putouts in 1981, his record for total chances in 1982 and his record for assists in 1983.

== Fielding prowess ==
Pirates broadcaster Bob Prince began referring to Mazeroski as simply "The Glove," as the perennial Gold Glove candidate set the bar for defense at his position that would still be in place decades later. Houston Astros and future Hall of Fame second baseman Joe Morgan called him "the gold standard" for infield defense.

Mazeroski became known for his ability to turn double plays. Besides his ability to maneuver his feet like a dancer and his skill in transferring the ball cleanly, his exceptionally strong legs helped him in withstanding rough slides by base-runners trying to break up the play. Coupled with acute baseball instincts, he displayed range in the field, as evidenced by the nine seasons that he led the league in assists per nine innings; recent analytics credit him similarly in total zone runs at the position. Remarkably, Mazeroski was able to accomplish this even though he played nearly half of his games at Forbes Field, whose infield was widely thought to be the worst in the majors because of its alabaster-like surface and many errant hops.

What made Mazeroski unique was his trademark glove, which was not much larger than his left hand. Its compactness allowed for a quicker grip, ball transfer, and release, especially on double play attempts. Once broken in, the piece of equipment would see action for several years at a time.n"Maz never really caught the ball, never really closed his glove over it turning the double play," said Pirates shortstop Gene Alley, who assisted Mazeroski on many of his 161 double plays in the 1966 season, still a major league record. "He could tilt his glove at an angle and hold his hand just so. It was a wonder the ball stayed in there. Then it would slide out in his hand just like that. He was the only one I ever saw do it like that."

Five decades after Mazeroski played his final game, he still held the major league records for second basemen for most double plays in a season (161), most double plays in a career (1,706), most years leading the league in twin killings (eight), and most seasons leading in assists (nine). His 543 assists in 1964 were the most by any second baseman between 1938 and 1983.

Dick Groat, Mazeroski's first double-play partner in the big leagues, said, "He had marvelous range, great instincts and never threw to the wrong base. His release on the double play was phenomenal. When Maz was a kid, I had a couple of years' experience on him. If I would move Maz and tell him to play here or play there, I never had to tell him a second time. Ever."

Mazeroski was known for extraordinary durability, especially given the physical demands of the second base position and chronic lower body issues later in his career. In a span of 12 seasons (1957–1968), he started 150 or more games seven times and at least 129 in each one. In 1966 and 1967, the iron man was in the field for all except 32 of a possible 2,921 2/3 innings.

=== Triple plays in film and reality ===
Mazeroski was the focus of a staged game-ending triple play as part of a cameo appearance in the 1968 film The Odd Couple. In the scene, Oscar Madison is distracted from witnessing the play by an annoying phone call from Felix Unger (immediately after predicting to fellow sportswriter Heywood Hale Broun the Mets still have a chance to win if Mazeroski hits into a triple play). Reportedly, the scene was actually filmed just prior to the start of a regular game at Shea Stadium on June 27, 1967. Maz reported that he was given only 10 minutes to get it done:

They had a guy out there pitching and he was throwing fastballs. I knew I had to hit a liner to the third baseman. It only took two takes. The first pitch, I hit a line drive that went just foul. The second one, I hit a one-hopper right to third. He caught it, stepped on third, threw to second, threw to first, a triple play. Now that took talent!"

Jack Fisher was the pitcher for the Mets in that scene. In reality, Mazeroski never suffered such an inglorious moment during his playing days, but he did record two triple plays as a fielder, both against the Cincinnati Reds. On April 18, 1966, in the seventh inning of a home game, Vada Pinson struck out during a double steal attempt. Catcher Jesse Gonder threw to third baseman Bob Bailey, who then threw to Mazeroski to retire Tommy Harper off second base, and Mazeroski then threw to first baseman Donn Clendenon to retire Pete Rose off first base; the Pirates went on to win 4–3. And on July 31, 1968, in the second game of a doubleheader, Tommy Helms lined out to shortstop Gene Alley in the fourth inning of a 10-1 Pirates victory; Alley threw to Mazeroski, who then threw to Clendenon, retiring Lee May and Tony Pérez before they could return to their bases.

== Hall of Fame selection ==
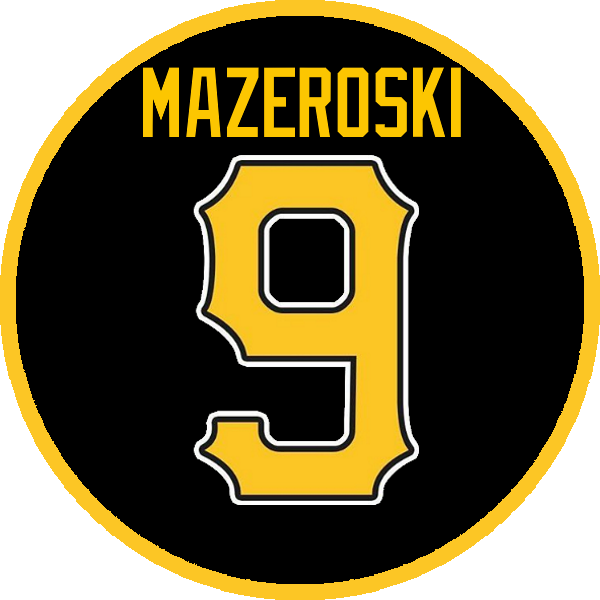
Bill Mazeroski's number 9 was retired by the Pittsburgh Pirates in 1987.

Mazeroski became eligible for the Hall of Fame in 1978 but initially drew little support before gradually gaining in the voting nearly every year; he ran out of initial eligibility in 1992, having never received 50% of the vote. Skeptics pointed to his shortcomings as a hitter; his .299 on-base percentage remains the lowest of any non-pitcher in the Hall, though his power at the plate brings his on-base plus slugging figure more in line with other defensive stars elected previously, including Rabbit Maranville, Ray Schalk, and Luis Aparicio. Newsweek columnist George Will remarked in 1995, "The exclusion of Mazeroski from Cooperstown is a case of simple discrimination against defensive skills." Mazeroski was elected to the Baseball Hall of Fame in 2001.

On induction day in Cooperstown, Mazeroski only made it as far into his prepared remarks as thanking the Veterans Committee voters for choosing a player based largely on defensive skills (a rarity) before getting so overcome with emotion that he had to stop. Apologizing to those who "had to come all the way up here to hear this crap," he then sat down to a long and loud standing ovation from the audience and his fellow Hall of Famers.

== Life after baseball ==
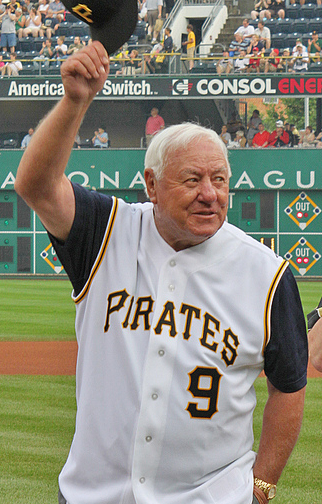
Mazeroski at PNC Park for the 50th anniversary celebration of the 1960 World Series

In 1987, Mazeroski ran for the Democratic nomination for County Commissioner in Westmoreland County, Pennsylvania but his bid was unsuccessful.

Mazeroski and his wife Milene (née Nicholson) lived in Panama City, Florida. Milene was previously a secretary for Rex Bowen, at the time the head of the scouting department with the Pirates. Bill and Milene Mazeroski had two sons. Darren is a retired junior college baseball coach, while Dave is an atmospheric scientist.

The annual "Bill Mazeroski Golf Tournament" is held each spring. Proceeds from the event go to a baseball scholarship which is awarded to a senior year player graduating from Buckeye Local High School in Warren Township, which is located near his former high school. Mazeroski was featured in an FSN Pittsburgh commercial which featured former Pirates first baseman Sean Casey.

== Death ==
Mazeroski died in Lansdale, Pennsylvania, on February 20, 2026, at the age of 89. Pittsburgh Pirates chairman Bob Nutting called him "one of a kind, a true Pirates legend, a National Baseball Hall of Famer, and one of the finest defensive second basemen the game has ever seen."

== Honors ==
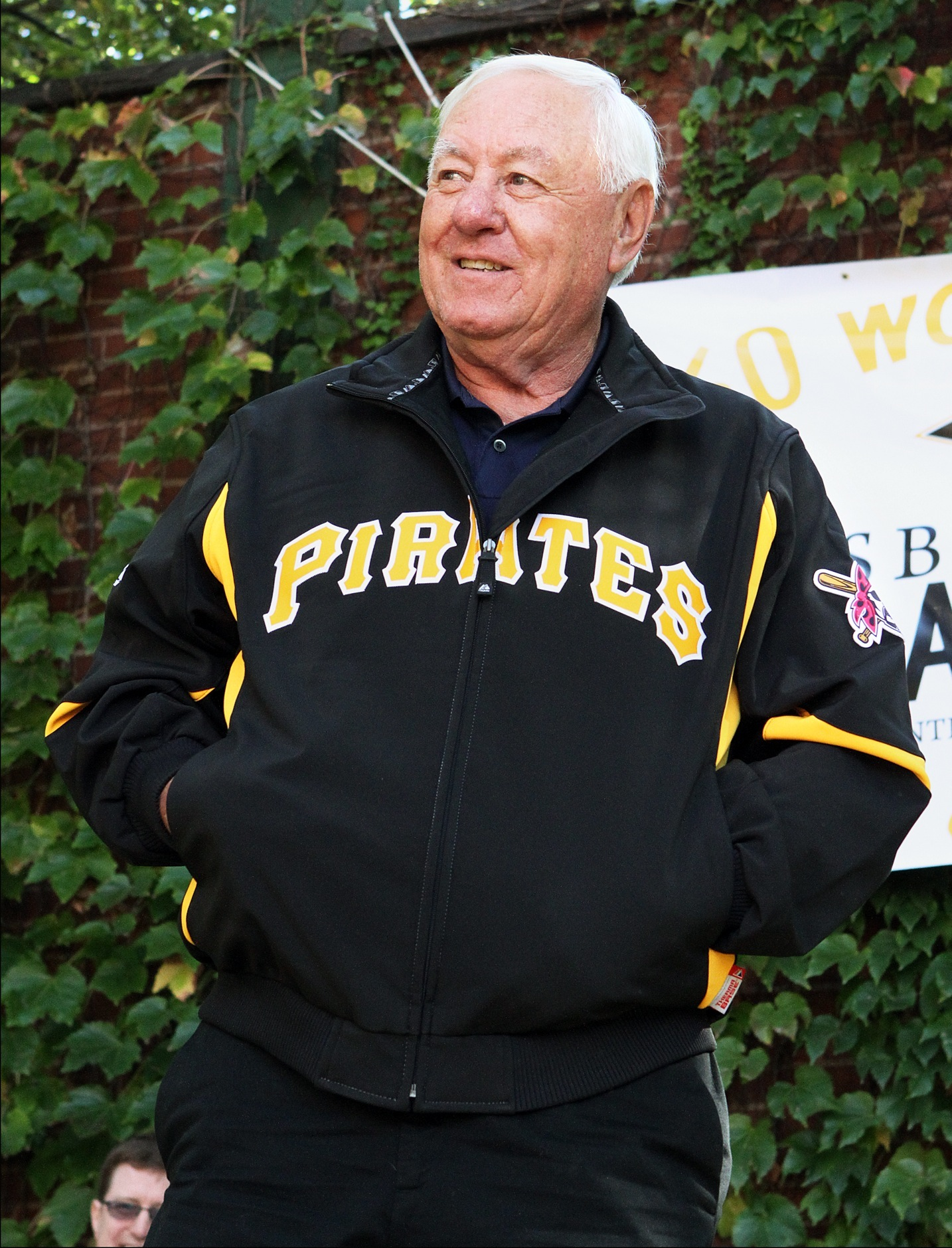
Mazeroski in 2010

In 1979, Mazeroski was inducted into the National Polish-American Sports Hall of Fame.

In 1995, Harrison Central High School in Cadiz, Ohio had a field donated by Mazeroski which later became known as Mazeroski Field. In 2003, Buckeye Local High School in Rayland (which had since absorbed Warren Consolidated) honored him by naming their new baseball field after him, placing a monument behind home plate in recognition.

In 2004, the Ohio Valley Athletic Conference saluted Mazeroski by electing him among the inaugural members of their Hall of Fame, alongside Boston Celtic great John Havlicek and Olympic wrestler Bobby Douglas.

Mazeroski was recognized by Major League Baseball by being selected to throw out the first pitch of the Home Run Derby that preceded the 2006 All-Star Game at Pittsburgh's PNC Park, receiving a long standing ovation. He also was picked to manage the National League during the All-Star Legends and Celebrity Softball Game during the All-Star week celebrations.

In 2022, Mazeroski was inducted as an inaugural member of the Pirates Hall of Fame.

== See also ==
- List of Gold Glove middle infield duos
- List of Gold Glove Award winners at second base
- List of Major League Baseball career hits leaders
- List of Major League Baseball career assists as a second baseman leaders
- List of Major League Baseball career double plays as a second baseman leaders
- List of Major League Baseball career putouts as a second baseman leaders
- List of Major League Baseball players who spent their entire career with one franchise
