= Lenny Levy =

American baseball player, coach, and scout (1913–1993)

- Born: Leonard Howard Levy; June 11, 1913; Pittsburgh, Pennsylvania, U.S.
- Died: February 2, 1993 (aged 79); Palm Desert, California, U.S.
- Education: Taylor Allderdice High School
- Occupation(s): Baseball player, scout and coach; car dealership owner
- Height: 5'10½

Leonard Howard Levy (June 11, 1913 – February 2, 1993) was an American professional baseball player, coach and scout. He coached in Major League Baseball for the Pittsburgh Pirates for seven seasons (1957–1963).

== Biography ==
Of Jewish descent, Levy was born in Pittsburgh, Pennsylvania. In 1932, he graduated from Taylor Allderdice High School, where he was on the baseball, basketball, and football teams. He started out as a ticket taker at Forbes Field. He became a batboy for the Pirates, and was a catcher in the minor leagues during 1936. During World War II, he was stationed in China with the Marines. He began his coaching career in 1947. He worked as a talent scout from 1951 to 1956. After his baseball career, Levy opened a car dealership in Pittsburgh.

Levy was later inducted into the Western Pennsylvania Jewish Sports Hall of Fame. He died in Palm Desert, California.

== See also ==
- List of Jews in Sports
