= List of Washington State University people =

The Washington State University Alumni Association defines an alumnus as anyone who was a student at WSU and is no longer attending. This page lists accomplished alumni and faculty members of WSU.

== Nobel laureates ==
- Norman Borlaug, Nobel Peace Prize, 1970, recipient for "Green Revolution", honorary doctorate recipient from WSU
- Irwin Rose, 1948, 2004 Nobel Prize in Chemistry winner for research in immune defense and proteins; first year of undergraduate study was at WSU; received WSU Regents' Distinguished Alumnus Award in 2005
- Mario Vargas Llosa, recipient of 2010 Nobel Prize in Literature, visiting faculty, 1968–69

== Notable alumni ==
=== Academe ===
- Judith A. Bense, academic; president of University of West Florida
- Howard Bowen, 1929 B.A. economics, 1933 M.A. economics, former president of Claremont University Center, University of Iowa, Grinnell College and American Association of Higher Education; received WSU Regents' Distinguished Alumnus Award in 1965
- David Comer, consultant in field of circuit design for IBM, Intel, Lawrence Livermore National Labs, and Mobility Systems Inc.
- Gordon G. Gallup, psychologist at University at Albany's Psychology Department in biopsychology program
- Weldon Gibson, 1938 B.A. business administration, executive vice president of Stanford Research Institute; received WSU Regents' Distinguished Alumnus Award in 1979
- Henry Heald, 1923 B.S. civil engineering, president of Ford Foundation, New York University, Illinois Institute of Technology, and American Society for Engineering Education; received WSU Regents' Distinguished Alumnus Award in 1962
- W. Hudson Kensel, historian of American West
- David Miller, Seattle architect; co-founder of Miller/Hull Partnership; architecture professor at University of Washington; chair of UW Department of Architecture 2007–15
- George B. Thomas, former professor of mathematics at MIT; best known for being author of widely used calculus textbook
- Jon Wefald, former president of Kansas State University
- Raymond L. Williams, Hispanic studies scholar at the University of California, Riverside

=== Animal husbandry ===
- Helen Elaine Freeman, conservationist and endangered species advocate; specialized in saving snow leopards
- Ivan Peterson, 1942 D.V.M., member of Alpha Tau Omega; president of Sphinx Club and of Crimson Court; veterinarian in California; worked with television series Lassie; friend to Jane Goodall and helped sponsor her chimpanzee research

=== The arts, literature and media ===
- Sherman Alexie, 1994 B.A. American studies, author and filmmaker; received WSU Regents' Distinguished Alumnus Award in 2003
- Rudy Autio, sculptor, best known for figurative ceramic vessels
- Cindy Brunson, 1996 B.A. communications/broadcasting, ESPN anchor, Pac-12 Networks commentator
- Ana Cabrera, 2004 B.A. communications, CNN reporter and anchor
- Betty Feves, artist
- Deborah Gardner, Peace Corps volunteer murdered in Tonga in 1976; subject of American Taboo by Philip Weiss
- Art Gilmore, 1931, voice actor and announcer
- Keith Jackson, 1954 B.A. sports communications, ABC-TV sports commentator; received WSU Regents' Distinguished Alumnus Award in 1978
- Edward Kienholz, pop art installation artist
- Grace Kim, cofounder of Schemata Workshop architecture firm in Seattle; cohousing expert; author of The Survival Guide to Architectural Internship and Career Development; commissioner of the Seattle Planning Commission
- Gary Larson, 1972 B.A. communications, Far Side cartoonist; received WSU Regents' Distinguished Alumnus Award in 1990
- Dolph Lundgren, Swedish actor, studied chemical engineering for a year at Washington State
- Scott MacDonald, television actor
- Patrick F. McManus, outdoor humor writer; studied at Washington State College before it became Washington State University
- Edward R. Murrow, 1930 B.A. speech, journalist for CBS; "father of television news broadcasting"; WWII radio correspondent; Hear It Now radio program host; See It Now television program host; received WSU Regents' Distinguished Alumnus Award in 1963
- Krist Novoselic, 2016 B.S. social sciences, founding member and bassist for grunge band Nirvana
- Eric Saindon, B.A. 1996, winner of the 2022 Academy Award for Best Visual Effects for his work as a visual effects supervisor on the film Avatar: The Way of Water while working for Wētā FX
- Barry Serafin, 1964 B.A. humanities, Emmy Award winning CBS and ABC News correspondent; received WSU Regents' Distinguished Alumnus Award in 1991.
- D. C. Simpson, creator of webcomic Ozy and Millie and political cartoon I Drew This
- Clyfford Still, 1935 MFA, abstract expressionist painter
- Frances Yeend, lyric soprano opera singer

=== Business ===
- Paul Allen, 1977 (1973–75), co-founder of Microsoft; owner of Vulcan Enterprises, Seattle Seahawks and Portland Trail Blazers; philanthropist; received WSU Regents' Distinguished Alumnus Award in 1999
- Gary Dahl, businessman and inventor of the pet rock
- Jamie Kern Lima, 1999 B.A. business administration, co-founder of IT Cosmetics
- Robert L. Phillips, 1976 B.A. economics and B.A. mathematics author, entrepreneur and professor

=== Government, law and politics ===
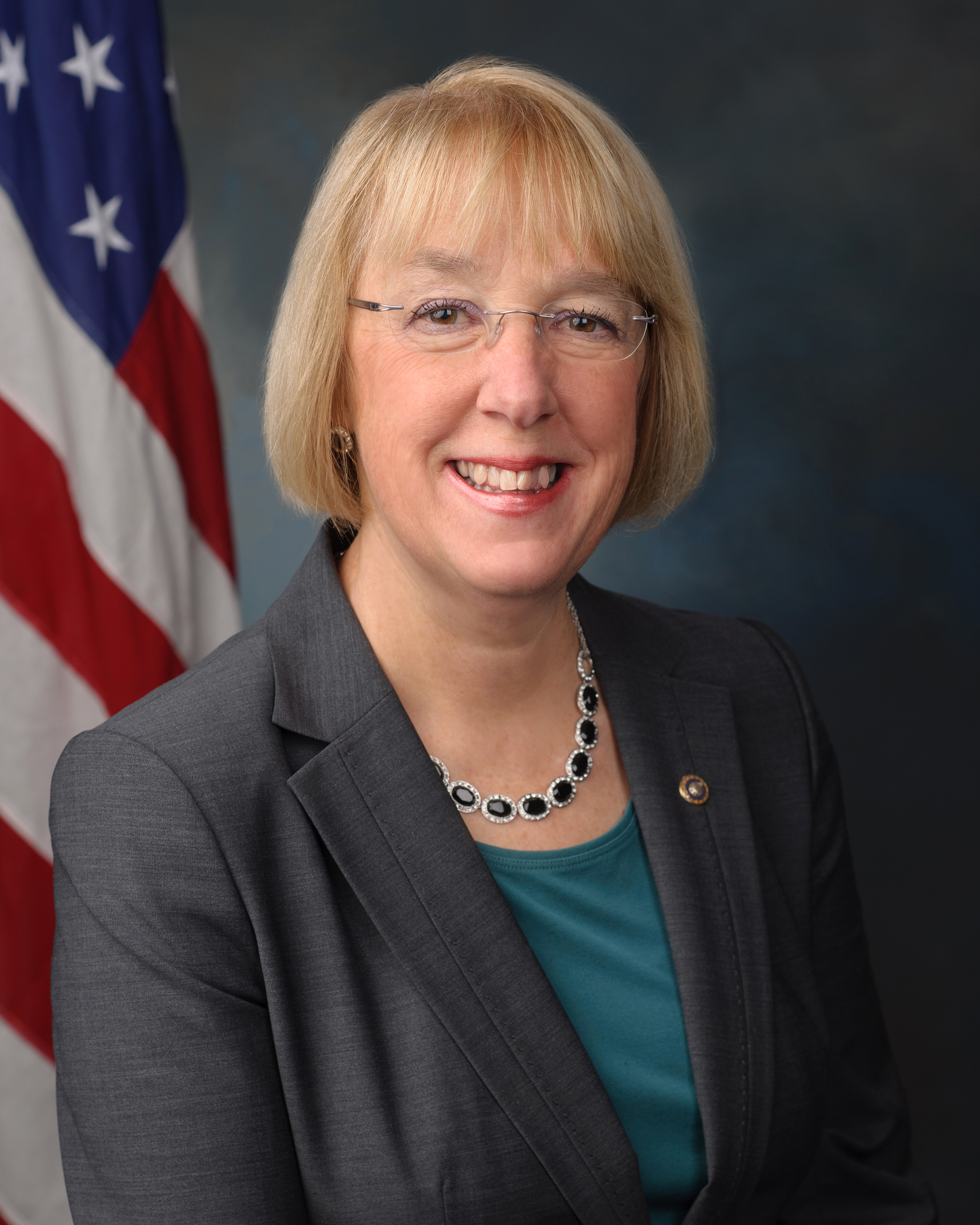
U.S. Senator Patty Murray

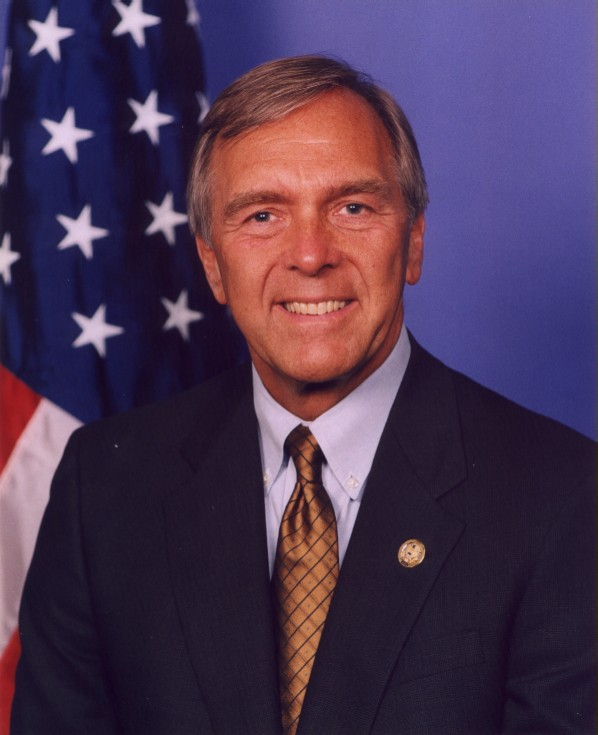
Former Congressman George Nethercutt

- Svend Auken, 1962, Danish politician, minister of Environmental Affairs 1993–2001
- Bob Brogoitti, Oregon state representative
- John C. Early, American colonial administrator in the Philippines
- John Folger, 1914 B.S. horticulture, 1917 M.S. horticulture, US Ambassador to Belgium 1957–59; member of board of governors of New York Stock Exchange; president of Investment Bankers Association of America; chaired GOP National Finance Committee; received WSU Regents' Distinguished Alumnus Award in 1963
- Walt Horan, politician; Republican member of United States House of Representatives for ten terms
- Mike Lowry, 1962 B.A. general studies, former governor of Washington
- Jim Moeller, politician from Washington, serves in Washington State House of Representatives representing 49th Legislative District
- Sid Morrison, 1954 B.S. horticulture, US congressman, 1981–93, Washington's 4th District
- Patty Murray, 1972 B.A. physical education, US senator representing Washington
- Marshall Neill, 1936 B.A. political science, federal district court judge; Washington State Supreme Court judge; received WSU Regents' Distinguished Alumnus Award in 1979
- Travis Nelson, Democrat representing Oregon's 44th House district in the Oregon Legislature
- George Nethercutt, 1967 B.A. English, US congressman, 1995–2005
- Eugene Prince, 1952 Agr. Eng., State representative
- Sam Reed, 2000–2013 Washington secretary of state
- Robert A. Roe, Democrat representing New Jersey in US House of Representatives for over 23 years
- Jim Youngsman, member of the Washington House of Representatives

=== Humanities ===
- Gary J. Coleman, general authority of the Church of Jesus Christ of Latter-day Saints
- Anthony Curcio, 2004 social sciences, author and youth speaker; athlete; became notorious criminal known as D.B. Tuber after masterminding armored car robbery; has since devoted life to educating youth on drug addiction
- Timothy Leary, 1946 M.S. psychology
- Laurence Peter, 1963 Ed.D., co-author of international best seller The Peter Principle: Why Things Go Wrong; author of three sequels, The Peter Prescription, The Peter Plan, and The Peter Pyramid; received WSU Regents' Distinguished Alumnus Award in 1980
- William Julius Wilson, 1966 Ph.D. sociology, wrote The Truly Disadvantaged: The Inner City, the Underclass and Public Policy and The Declining Significance of Race; one of nine people to receive National Medal of Science; received WSU Regents' Distinguished Alumnus Award in 1988

=== Military ===
- James Fleming, colonel in US Air Force; helicopter pilot; Medal of Honor recipient for life-saving actions at Duc Co, South Vietnam in 1968
- Charles Ross Greening, 1936 B.S. Fine Arts, colonel in US Air Force; captained the Hari Kari-er in the Doolittle Raid of Japan
- Vernon J. Kondra, 1961 B.S. Biology, Air Force lieutenant general, Gulf War, led the largest air lift operation in history
- Dale Noyd, decorated captain and fighter pilot in US Air Force who gained worldwide attention when he became conscientious objector to protest Vietnam War
- Sigmund R. Petersen, 1961 B.S. in civil engineering, rear admiral in National Oceanic and Atmospheric Administration Commissioned Officer Corps (NOAA Corps); fourth director of NOAA Corps (1990–1995)
- Ronald J. Shurer II, 2001 B.A. Business Administration, staff sergeant and US Army Special Forces medic; recipient of the Medal of Honor for actions in the Battle of Shok Valley, 2008 in Afghanistan

=== Science, space and technology ===
- John Abelson, 1960 B.S. physics, co-founder and president of Agouron Pharmaceuticals; through rational drug design developed Viracept, leading drug used for controlling HIV infections, which cut death rate in half among AIDS patients in the mid-1990s; nephew of Philip Abelson and Neva Abelson; received the WSU Regents' Distinguished Alumnus Award in 2004
- Neva Abelson, 1934 B.S. chemistry, developed blood test for Rh disease; wife of Philip Abelson; received WSU Regents' Distinguished Alumnus Award in 1989
- Philip Abelson, 1933 B.S. chemistry, 1935 M.S. physics, "father of the nuclear-fueled submarine"; Manhattan Project participant; editor of Science; husband of Neva Abelson; received WSU Regents' Distinguished Alumnus Award in 1962
- Gary L. Bennett, scientist and engineer, specializing in aerospace and energy
- Jacob Bigeleisen, 1941 M.S. chemistry, founder of modern school of isotope chemistry; Manhattan Project participant; researcher at Brookhaven National Laboratory; vice president for research, dean of Graduate Studies and chemistry professor at State University of New York at Stony Brook; received WSU Regents' Distinguished Alumnus Award in 1983
- William A. Bugge, 1922 B.S. civil engineering, Washington director of highways 1949–63; project director for design and construction of Bay Area Rapid Transit (BART) System in San Francisco; received WSU Regents' Distinguished Alumnus Award in 1980
- Jeffery Dagle, B.S., M.S.; electrical engineer; fellow of the IEEE
- John Fabian, 1962 B.S. mechanical engineering, NASA astronaut; received WSU Regents' Distinguished Alumnus Award in 1983
- Hary Gunarto, 1988 Ph.D. electrical & computer engineering, Professor Emeritus of Ritsumeikan Asia Pacific University, Japan
- Sharon Hillier, 1982 Ph.D. Bacteriology and Public Health, faculty member of University of Pittsburgh Medical Center
- Charles Glen King, 1918 B.S. chemistry, leading authority on Vitamin C; received WSU Regents' Distinguished Alumnus Award in 1964
- Simon S. Lam, 1969 B.S. electrical engineering, 2004 ACM SIGCOMM Award winner; member of National Academy of Engineering
- Krist Novoselic, 2016 B.S social science; former bassist from punk rock band Nirvana & Sweet 75; FAA licensed Pilot
- Wajih Owais, Jordanian professor and researcher; chairman of board of directors of King Abdullah University Hospital;t President of Jordan University of Science and Technology
- Martin Pall, professor emeritus of biochemistry and basic medical sciences, specializing in Chronic Fatigue Syndrome and multiple chemical sensitivity
- Irwin Rose, 1948, 2004 Nobel Prize in Chemistry winner for research in immune defense and proteins; discoveries may lead to development of drugs to combat Parkinson's and Alzheimer's disease, cystic fibrosis, and cervical cancer; first year of undergraduate study was at WSU; received WSU Regents' Distinguished Alumnus Award in 2005
- Karl Sax, 1916 B.S. horticulture, radiation biologist and geneticist; received WSU Regents' Distinguished Alumnus Award in 1966
- Edmund Schweitzer, 1977 Ph.D. electrical engineering, founder of Schweitzer Engineering Laboratories
- Melissa Skala, 2002 B.S., cancer researcher and Professor of Biomedical Engineering at the Morgridge Institute for Research
- Orville Vogel, 1939 Ph.D. agronomy, wheat breeder whose findings sparked "Green Revolution"; received WSU Regents' Distinguished Alumnus Award in 1977
- Allan Wilson, 1957 M.S. zoology, evolutionist; received WSU Regents' Distinguished Alumnus Award in 1990

=== Sports and athletics ===
- Hamza Abdullah, former NFL safety for Denver Broncos, Cleveland Browns, and Arizona Cardinals
- Husain Abdullah, former National Football League (NFL) strong safety for Minnesota Vikings and Kansas City Chiefs
- Frank Akins, former NFL running back for Washington Redskins
- Mike Akiu, football player
- Josh Akognon, member of the Nigeria national basketball team
- Calvin Armstrong, CFL offensive tackle for Edmonton Eskimos
- Dominique Arnold, 1996, track & field NCAA champion; American record holder in 110m high hurdles (12.90)
- Rick Austin, former Major League Baseball pitcher for Cleveland Indians and Milwaukee Brewers
- Byron Bailey, former NFL running back for Detroit Lions and Green Bay Packers
- LaVar Ball, former basketball and football player
- Ed Barker, former NFL wide receiver for Pittsburgh Steelers and Washington Redskins
- Norton Barnhill, former National Basketball Association (NBA) guard for Seattle SuperSonics
- Kyle Basler, NFL punter for Cleveland Browns
- Aron Baynes, NBA center for San Antonio Spurs; 2014 NBA champion
- Pat Beach, former NFL tight end
- Todd Belitz, former MLB pitcher
- Leon Bender, drafted by Oakland Raiders in 1998, but died before playing an NFL game
- Troy Bienemann, NFL tight end for Arizona Cardinals
- Gale Bishop, former player for Philadelphia Warriors in BAA
- Drew Bledsoe, 1993 B.A. educ., NFL quarterback with Dallas Cowboys, New England Patriots, Buffalo Bills; top pick of 1993 NFL draft
- Dorian Boose, former NFL defensive end for New York Jets and Washington Redskins
- Ed Bouchee, former MLB first baseman for Philadelphia Phillies, Chicago Cubs and New York Mets
- Adam Braidwood, first overall by Edmonton Eskimos in 2006 Canadian College Draft
- Bob Bratkowski, current offensive coordinator for NFL's Cincinnati Bengals
- Bobo Brayton, 1950 B.A. physical education, 1959 M.S. physical education, former WSU baseball coach
- Ed Brett, former NFL defensive end
- Alex Brink, NFL quarterback for Houston Texans
- Steve Broussard, NFL running back and WSU assistant football coach
- Mkristo Bruce, NFL defensive end for Jacksonville Jaguars
- Deone Bucannon, NFL inside linebacker for Arizona Cardinals
- Michael Bumpus, wide receiver with Seattle Seahawks
- Joe Burks, former NFL center
- Greg Burns, defensive backs coach for Kansas State University
- Lewis Bush, former linebacker for San Diego Chargers and Kansas City Chiefs
- Hugh Campbell, former head coach of Houston Oilers
- Ron Cey, MLB third baseman, six-time All-Star; graduate of Mount Tahoma High School in Tacoma
- Cliff Chambers, former MLB pitcher for the Chicago Cubs, Pittsburgh Pirates, and St. Louis Cardinals
- John Chaplin, 1963 B.A. geography, WSU track & field coach, 2000 US Olympic coach
- Rich Cho, former general manager of the Portland Trail Blazers and the Charlotte Hornets
- Gail Cogdill, NFL wide receiver, 3X Pro Bowl participant and 1960 NFL Rookie of the Year
- Erik Coleman, defensive back for Atlanta Falcons
- Don Collins, NBA player for Atlanta Hawks
- Jed Collins, NFL fullback; signed with Philadelphia Eagles in 2008
- Gene Conley, MLB All-Star and NBA player; first person to win championship in both sports
- Joe Danelo, former NFL placekicker
- Devard Darling, NFL wide receiver for Baltimore Ravens
- James Darling, NFL middle linebacker for Arizona Cardinals
- Jason David, NFL cornerback for New Orleans Saints
- Steve Dildine, linebacker for San Francisco 49ers
- James Donaldson, former NBA center
- Dan Doornink, former running back for New York Giants and Seattle Seahawks; practicing MD of internal medicine
- Chad Eaton, former NFL defensive tackle and recipient of Morris Trophy
- Dave Edler, former MLB third baseman for Seattle Mariners
- Turk Edwards, former offensive tackle for Washington Redskins, member of Pro Football Hall of Fame
- Craig Ehlo, former NBA player for Cleveland Cavaliers and Atlanta Hawks
- Garner Ekstran, former CFL defensive end for Saskatchewan Roughriders, winner of 1966 Grey Cup
- Jack Elway, football head coach at Stanford and San Jose State, father of Hall of Fame quarterback John Elway
- Dick Farman, former offensive lineman and Pro Bowl selection for Washington Redskins
- Mark Fields, former linebacker and Pro Bowl selection for New Orleans Saints and Carolina Panthers
- Danielle Fisher, at 20, youngest person to summit tallest mountain on each continent (2005)
- Isaac Fontaine, former NBA guard for Memphis Grizzlies
- Eric Frampton, NFL safety for Oakland Raiders, Minnesota Vikings
- Rodrigo de la Fuente, Spanish basketball player, formerly with FC Barcelona
- Aaron Garcia, quarterback for New York Dragons of the Arena Football League
- Jason Gesser, quarterback for Utah Blaze of Arena Football League
- Steve Gleason, 1998 Pac-10 defensive MVP and special teams captain of New Orleans Saints; Congressional Gold Medal recipient
- Phil Glover, linebacker for Tampa Bay Storm
- Ed Goddard, former All-American quarterback and NFL player
- Kenny Graham, former AFL All-Star safety for San Diego Chargers
- Dan Grayson, American gridiron football player
- Brad Greenberg, current head men's basketball coach at Radford University
- Ken Greene, former NFL safety for St. Louis Cardinals and San Diego Chargers
- Jason Hanson, 1993 B.S., Zoo., longtime NFL placekicker for Detroit Lions
- Glenn Harper, former CFL punter and winner of Grey Cup
- Tony Harris (1970–2007), pro basketball player
- Jerome Harrison, former NCAA All-American and running back for Cleveland Browns
- James Hasty, former Pro Bowl cornerback for Kansas City Chiefs
- Scott Hatteberg, former MLB first baseman for Oakland Athletics and Cincinnati Reds
- Chris Hayes, former defensive back and Super Bowl XXXI champion for Green Bay Packers
- Mel Hein, 1931 B.S. physical education, All-American in 1930; eight-time All-Pro with New York Giants; received WSU Regents' Distinguished Alumnus Award in 1983; member of Pro Football Hall of Fame
- Mark Hendrickson, former NBA player and MLB pitcher for Los Angeles Dodgers
- Jason Hill, NFL wide receiver for San Francisco 49ers
- Alex Hoffman-Ellis, football linebacker
- Jerry Houghton, former NFL offensive tackle
- Don Hover, former linebacker for Washington Redskins
- Erik Howard, former defensive tackle and member of two Super Bowl championship teams
- George Hurley, former offensive guard for Washington Redskins
- Ike Iroegbu (born 1995), American-born Nigerian basketball player for Hapoel Galil Elyon of the Israeli Basketball Premier League
- Bernard Jackson, former NFL defensive back
- Chris Jackson, wide receiver for AFL's Philadelphia Soul
- Tim Jankovich, men's basketball head coach at Illinois State University
- Eldon Jenne, former Olympic track and field athlete; head football and basketball coach at Pacific University
- Brian Kelly, former wide receiver and member of Canadian Football Hall of Fame
- Allan Kennedy, former NFL offensive tackle
- Samson Kimobwa, retired distance runner from Kenya
- Mike Kinkade, 2000 Olympic baseball gold medalist; played in Chicago Cubs organization
- Peter Koech, 1988 Olympic silver medalist, 3,000m steeplechase
- Julius Korir, 1984 Olympic steeplechase champion
- Bernard Lagat, 2000, two-time Olympic track & field medalist in 1500m
- Ryan Leaf, 1999 (1995–98), former NFL quarterback with San Diego Chargers; taken second in 1998 NFL draft
- Ron Lewis, former offensive guard for Washington Redskins
- Keith Lincoln, former NFL running back; record 206 yards rushing in 1964 American Football League Championship Game for San Diego Chargers, two-time Pro Bowl MVP
- Rian Lindell, kicker for the Buffalo Bills, Tampa Bay Buccaneers, Seattle Seahawks
- Gerry Lindgren, won 11 NCAA track & field distance running championships
- Chad Little, former NASCAR driver
- Don Long, MLB hitting coach for Pittsburgh Pirates, Cincinnati Reds
- Rien Long, 2003, only WSU player to win Outland Trophy, NFL defensive tackle for Tennessee Titans
- Dan Lynch, former first-team AP All-American football lineman, 1984
- John Marshall, defensive coordinator for Seattle Seahawks
- Rueben Mayes, former NFL running back with New Orleans Saints
- Rob Meier, former NFL defensive end for Jacksonville Jaguars
- Keith Millard, former NFL defensive lineman
- Gardner Minshew, NFL quarterback for the Jacksonville Jaguars, Philadelphia Eagles, and Indianapolis Colts
- Singor Mobley, former NFL safety for Dallas Cowboys
- Tom Niedenfuer, former MLB relief pitcher for Los Angeles Dodgers
- Laurie Niemi, former Pro Bowl offensive lineman for Washington Redskins
- Paul Noce, former MLB shortstop for Chicago Cubs and Cincinnati Reds
- John Olerud, former MLB first baseman for Toronto Blue Jays and Seattle Mariners
- Karl Paymah, NFL cornerback for Denver Broncos
- Scott Pelluer, former NFL linebacker for New Orleans Saints
- Brian Quinnett, former NBA player for New York Knicks and Dallas Mavericks
- Pete Rademacher, Olympic gold medalist for boxing in 1956
- George Raveling, one of winningest coaches in WSU history, member of College Basketball Hall of Fame
- Taylor Rochestie (born 1985) American-Montenegrin player for Hapoel Haifa of the Israel Basketball Premier League
- Lisa Roman, Canadian Olympic gold medalist for rowing in summer 2020, member of the WSU Hall of Fame
- Henry Rono, former track & field world record holder in 10,000m, 5,000m, 3,000m, and 3,000m steeplechase
- Timm Rosenbach, former NFL player with Phoenix Cardinals; quarterbacks coach for WSU 2003–07
- Rob Ryan, former MLB outfielder for Arizona Diamondbacks and Oakland Athletics
- Mark Rypien, former NFL quarterback, Super Bowl XXVI MVP with Washington Redskins
- Herb Schmalenberger, former college football coach at UC Davis
- Aaron Sele, former Major League Baseball pitcher
- Doug Sisk, former MLB relief pitcher
- Howie Slater, former NFL fullback
- Jonathan McKenzi Smith, NFL running back for Kansas City Chiefs
- Raonall Smith, former NFL outside linebacker for St. Louis Rams
- Jack Spring, former MLB relief pitcher
- Wes Stock, former MLB pitcher for Baltimore Orioles
- Chris Stokes, former Olympic bobsledder on the debut of the Jamaica national bobsleigh team at the 1988 Winter Olympics
- Wayne Sutton, former head football coach at Louisiana State University
- Harland Svare, former NFL player for the Los Angeles Rams and New York Giants; former head coach of the Rams and San Diego Chargers; former general manager of the Chargers
- Jack Thompson, 1984 Bus. Adm., former NFL quarterback known as "Throwin' Samoan"
- Klay Thompson, four-time NBA champion Golden State Warriors shooting guard
- Lamont Thompson, former All-American and NFL safety for Tennessee Titans
- Robbie Tobeck, former Pro Bowl center for Seattle Seahawks
- Marcus Trufant, 2003, first-round pick in 2003 NFL draft; All-Pro cornerback for Seattle Seahawks
- Mike Utley, former offensive lineman for Detroit Lions; became paralyzed during a game against Los Angeles Rams in 1991
- Jeff Varem, pro basketball player
- Ed Viesturs, 1987 D.V.M., one of 12 people in world and only American to climb 14 tallest mountains; unaided by supplemental oxygen
- Ian Waltz, eight-time NCAA All-American for discus and shot put, 2004 US Olympian for discus
- Duke Washington, former running back for Philadelphia Eagles
- Kyle Weaver, pro basketball player
- Mike Wilson, former NFL wide receiver for San Francisco 49ers
- Cory Withrow, NFL center for San Diego Chargers and Minnesota Vikings
- Paul Wulff, former NCAA All-American and WSU football head coach

=== Criminals ===
- Bryan Kohberger, convicted murderer who perpetrated the 2022 Idaho student murders

== Notable faculty ==
- Olusola Adesope, Boeing Distinguished Professor of STEM Education
- Brett Atwood, print and online journalist; co-founder of Rolling Stone Radio; former managing editor at Amazon.com, RealNetworks and Billboard magazine
- Buck Bailey, WSU baseball coach
- Josephine Thorndike Berry, head of the Department of Home Economics, State College of Washington
- Susmita Bose, Indian-American scientist and Herman and Brita Lindholm Endowed Chair Professor in the School of Mechanical and Materials Engineering at Washington State University
- Asif J. Chaudhry, Vice President of International Programs, United States Ambassador to Moldova 2008–2011, also WSU Ag Econ PhD graduate 1988
- Walter Clore, horticulture researcher; "father of the Washington wine industry"
- R. James Cook, plant pathologist, cropping systems and biotechnology researcher; led first field test of a genetically modified organism in the Pacific Northwest; member of the National Academy of Sciences
- Alfred W. Crosby, professor of history 1966–1977; coined the term "Columbian exchange" in his 1972 book of the same name; considered a founder of the field of environmental history
- J. Thomas Dickinson, physicist, known for work in fracture, tribology and laser interactions with materials; Fellow of the American Association for the Advancement of Science
- William Henry Dietz ("Lone Star Dietz"), WSU football coach; won first annual Rose Bowl; professional football coach
- Gabriel Fielding, author in residence and professor of English
- Elson S. Floyd, professor of Higher Education Administration; president of Washington State University
- Roald H. Fryxell, WSU professor of geoarchaeology in the Department of Anthropology; namesake of the Fryxell crater on the Moon
- Jeffrey Gramlich, professor of accounting
- Yogendra Gupta, physicist, director of WSU Institute for Shock Physics; Fellow of the American Physical Society and the American Association for the Advancement of Science
- Alexander Kuo, humanities and creative writing professor; author; writer-in-residence
- Mark G. Kuzyk, physicist, discoverer of the Kuzyk limit and the Kuzyk quantum gap
- John M. Madsen, former dean and general authority of the Church of Jesus Christ of Latter-day Saints
- Armand Mauss, former professor of sociology and religious studies; frequently published works relating to Mormonism
- Amy Mazur, Claudius O. and Mary W. Johnson Distinguished Professor in Political Science
- Sue Peabody, Meyer Distinguished Professor of history
- Bhakta B. Rath, assistant professor of metallurgy and material Science; material physicist; head of the Materials Science and Component Technology of the United States Naval Research Laboratory
- V. Lane Rawlins, professor of economics and WSU president emeritus
- Cecilia Richards, mechanical engineer, known for her work on small-scale heat engines and on microelectromechanical systems
- Michael Skinner, molecular and reproduction biologist; made discoveries in epigenetics including reduction in male fertility for four generations; his findings appeared in Discover magazine's "100 top science stories of 2005"
- Samuel H. Smith, WSU President Emeritus; former NATO post-doctoral fellow
- William Jasper Spillman, WSU professor of agriculture; wheat breeder; independently rediscovered Mendel's Law of Heredity; "father of agricultural economics
- Clyfford Still, abstract expressionist painter, Clyfford Still Museum, Denver
- Mario Vargas Llosa, recipient of 2010 Nobel Prize in Literature, visiting faculty, 1968–69
- Orville Vogel, WSU and USDA wheat breeder; developer of semi-dwarf wheat varieties that fueled the Green Revolution; recipient of the National Medal of Science

== Notable regents ==
- Frances Penrose Owen, first woman on the WSU Board of Regents, serving 1957–1975
