= Adesope =

Adesope is both a given name and a surname. Notable people with the name include:

- Adesope Olajide (born 1977), Nigerian media personality
- Olusola Adesope (fl. 2005), Nigerian academic
