= Kevin Eliceiri =

American scientist

- Scientific career
- Fields: Microscopy, Biomedical Engineering, Medical Physics
- Institutions: University of Wisconsin, Madison Morgridge Institute
- Website: https://eliceirilab.org/

Kevin Eliceiri is an American scientist specializing in biological image analysis. He is the principal investigator of the Eliceiri Lab at the University of Wisconsin Madison. He is also the Director of UW-Madison's Center for Quantitive Cell Imaging and Director of the Morgridge Institute's FabLab.

== Biography ==
Eliceiri received his Bachelors (Bacteriology), Masters (Microbiology), and PhD (Bioimage Informatics) from the University of Wisconsin, Madison, training under the guidance of Professor John White on the role of calmodulin signaling during cytokinesis. Early in his career, he served as an information processing consultant for UW-Madison's integrated Microscopy Resource Center, eventually becoming a project manager for the Laboratory for Optical and Computational Instrumentation, the lab which he now directs.

Eliceiri has conducted research on computational and optical approaches to live cell imaging for over two decades, with a focus on multidimensional fluorescence approaches for cell studies and image informatics tools for image analysis. One focus of his research is to developing and applying non- invasive optical and computational approaches for understanding the role of the cellular microenvironment in normal and diseased processes.

Eliceiri also serves as PI and co-chair of Bioimaging North America (BINA), a network for sharing microscopy expertise.

== Honors ==
1. Romnes Faculty Fellowship, 2023–present
2. Open Hardware Fellow, 2022–present
3. SPIE Fellow, 2022–present
4. AIMBE Fellow, 2021–present
5. OSA Fellow, 2020–present
6. RRF Walter H. Helmerich Research Chair, McPherson Eye Research Institute (MERI), 2017– present

== Select Publications ==
- PyImageJ: A library for integrating ImageJ and Python. Rueden CT, Hiner MC, Evans EL 3rd, Pinkert MA, Lucas AM, Carpenter AE, Cimini BA, Eliceiri KW. Nat Methods. 2022 Nov;19(11):1326-1327. doi:10.1038/s41592-022-01655-4.
- Real-time polarization microscopy of fibrillar collagen in histopathology. Keikhosravi A, Shribak M, Conklin MW, Liu Y, Li B, Loeffler A, Levenson RM, Eliceiri KW. Sci Rep. 2021 Sep 24;11(1):19063. doi:10.1038/s41598-021-98600-w.
- Non-disruptive collagen characterization in clinical histopathology using cross-modality image synthesis. Keikhosravi A, Li B, Liu Y, Conklin MW, Loeffler AG, Eliceiri KW. Commun Biol. 2020 Jul 31;3(1):414. doi:10.1038/s42003-020-01151-5.
- Highly aligned stromal collagen is a negative prognostic factor following pancreatic ductal adenocarcinoma resection. Drifka CR, Loeffler AG, Mathewson K, Keikhosravi A, Eickhoff JC, Liu Y, Weber SM, Kao WJ, Eliceiri KW. Oncotarget. 2016 Nov 15;7(46):76197-76213. doi:10.18632/oncotarget.12772.
- ImageJ2: ImageJ for the next generation of scientific image data. Rueden CT, Schindelin J, Hiner MC, DeZonia BE, Walter AE, Arena ET, Eliceiri KW. BMC Bioinformatics. 2017 Nov 29;18(1):529. doi:10.1186/s12859-017-1934-z.
