= Dominique Brossard =

American professor of Life Sciences Communication

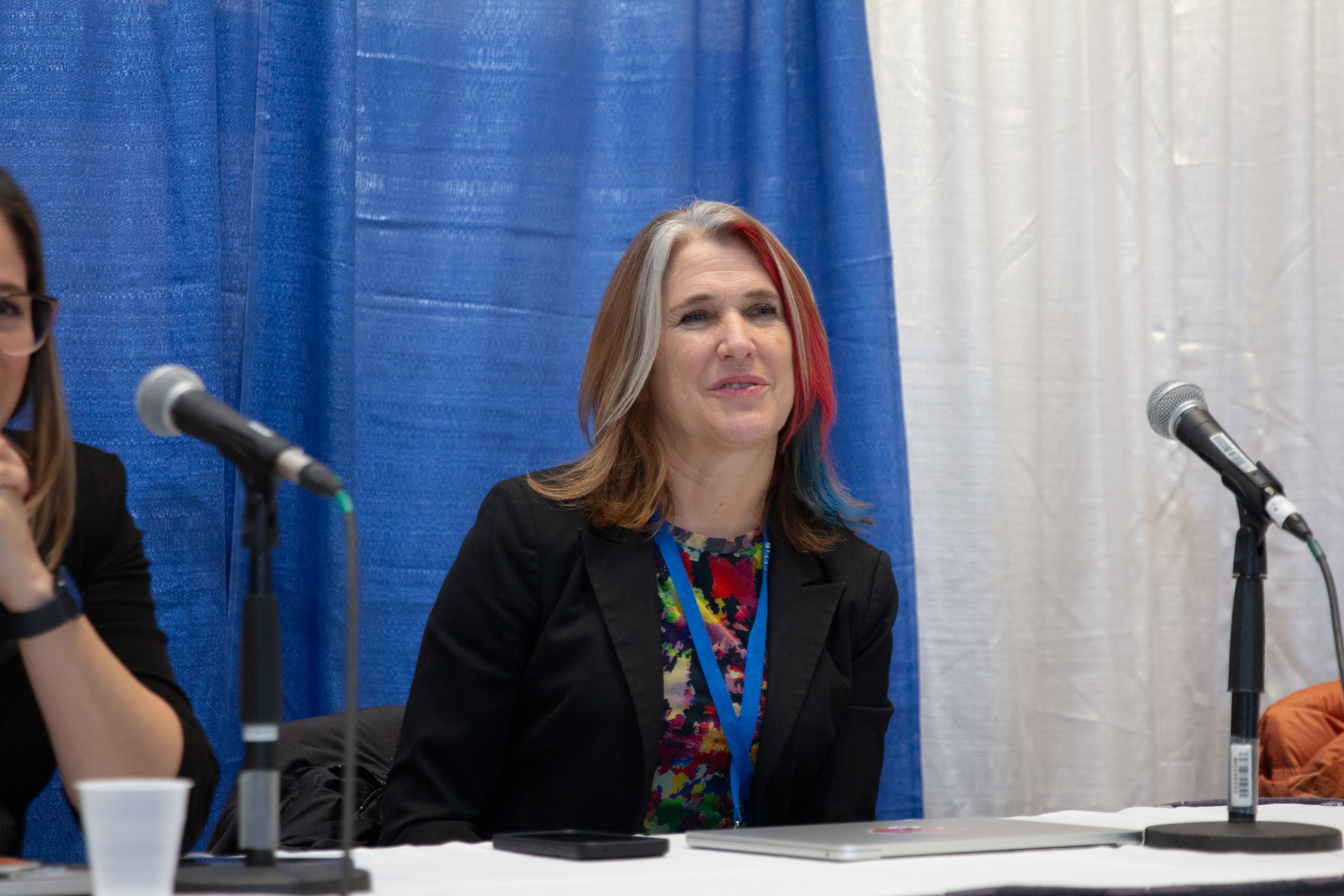
- Born: November 3, 1963 (age 62)
- Education: Ecole Nationale d'Agronomie de Toulouse, Cornell University
- Known for: Research on science communication in online environments
- Awards: Fellow of the American Association for the Advancement of Science
- Scientific career
- Fields: Life Sciences Communication, Science communication, Risk communication
- Workplaces: University of Wisconsin–Madison

Dominique Brossard (born November 3, 1963) is a professor in the Department of Life Sciences Communication at the University of Wisconsin–Madison. She is an affiliate of the university's Robert & Jean Holtz Center for Science and Technology Studies and other institutes at the university, including the Energy Institute, the Global Health Institute, and the Nelson Institute for Environmental Studies. Brossard also holds a position as a principal investigator at the Morgridge Institute for Research. She led Department of Life Sciences Communication for 12 years and created successful undergraduate and graduate programs in science communication.

In her academic work, Brossard focuses on the interactions between science, media, and public policy. She leads SciLab (Science Communication Incubator Lab) at the Morgridge Research Institute which investigates the dynamics of scientific discussion in online platforms and its implications for public engagement and discourse.

Prior to her academic appointments, Brossard was employed at Accenture in its Change Management Services Division and coordinated communication for the Agricultural Biotechnology Support Project II. She received her M.S. in plant biotechnology from the Ecole Nationale d’Agronomie de Toulouse and her M.P.S and Ph.D. in communication from Cornell University.
