= List of Major League Baseball career times on base leaders =

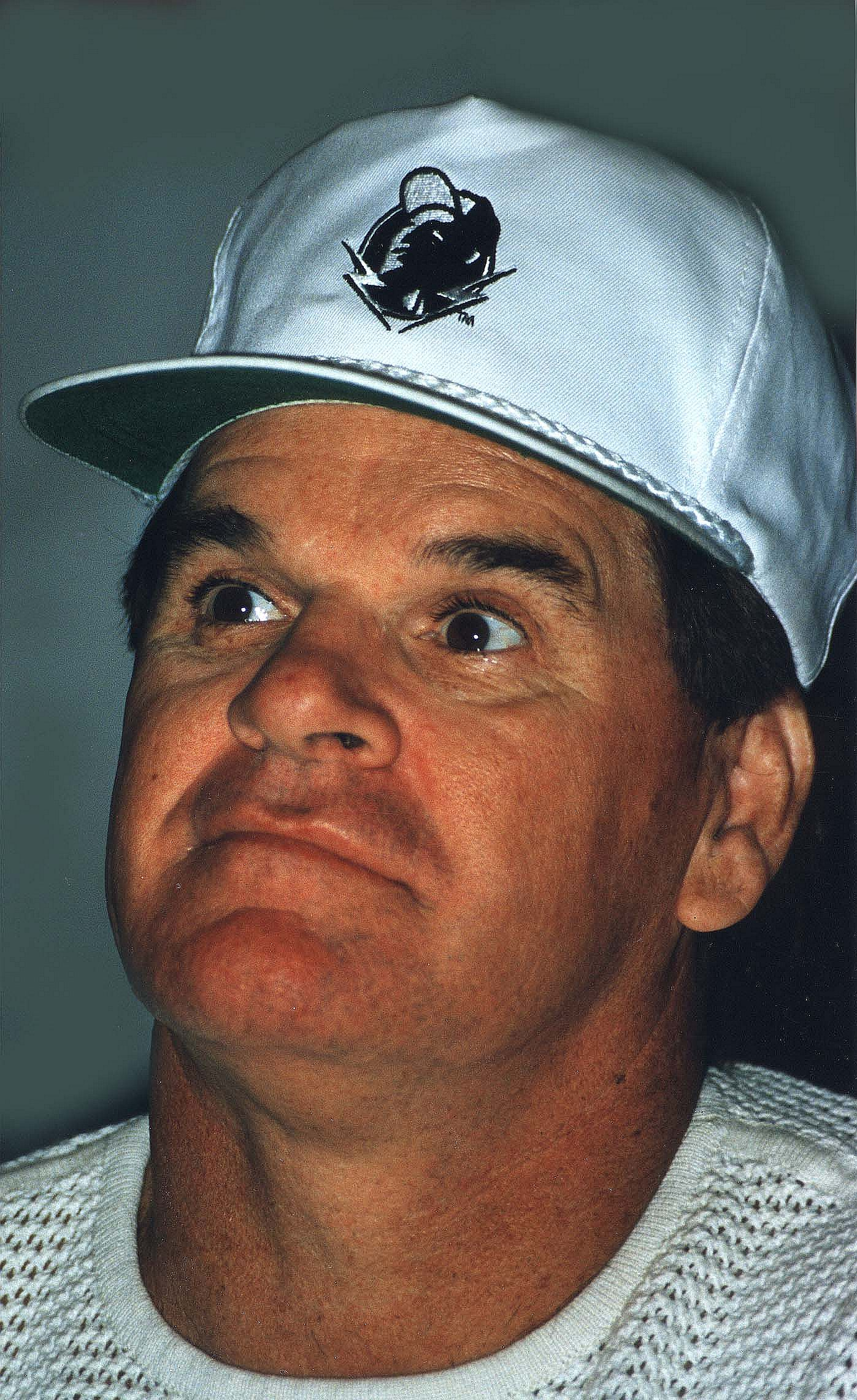
Pete Rose, the all-time leader in career times on base.

In baseball statistics, the term times on base, also abbreviated as TOB, is the cumulative total number of times a batter has reached base as a result of hits, walks, and hit by pitches. This statistic does not include times reaching first by way of error, dropped third strike, fielder's obstruction, or a fielder's choice, making this statistic somewhat of a misnomer.

Pete Rose is the all-time leader, being on base 5,929 times in his career. Barry Bonds (5,599), Ty Cobb (5,532), Rickey Henderson (5,343), Carl Yastrzemski (5,304), Stan Musial (5,282), and Hank Aaron (5,205) are the only other players to be on base more than 5,000 times.

== Key ==
**Rank**	Rank amongst leaders in career times on base. A blank field indicates a tie.
**Player (2027 TOB)**	Number of times on base during the 2027 Major League Baseball season.
**TOB**	Total career times on base.
*	Denotes elected to National Baseball Hall of Fame.
**Bold**	Denotes active player. (Note: A player is considered inactive if he has announced his retirement or has not played for a full season.)

== List ==
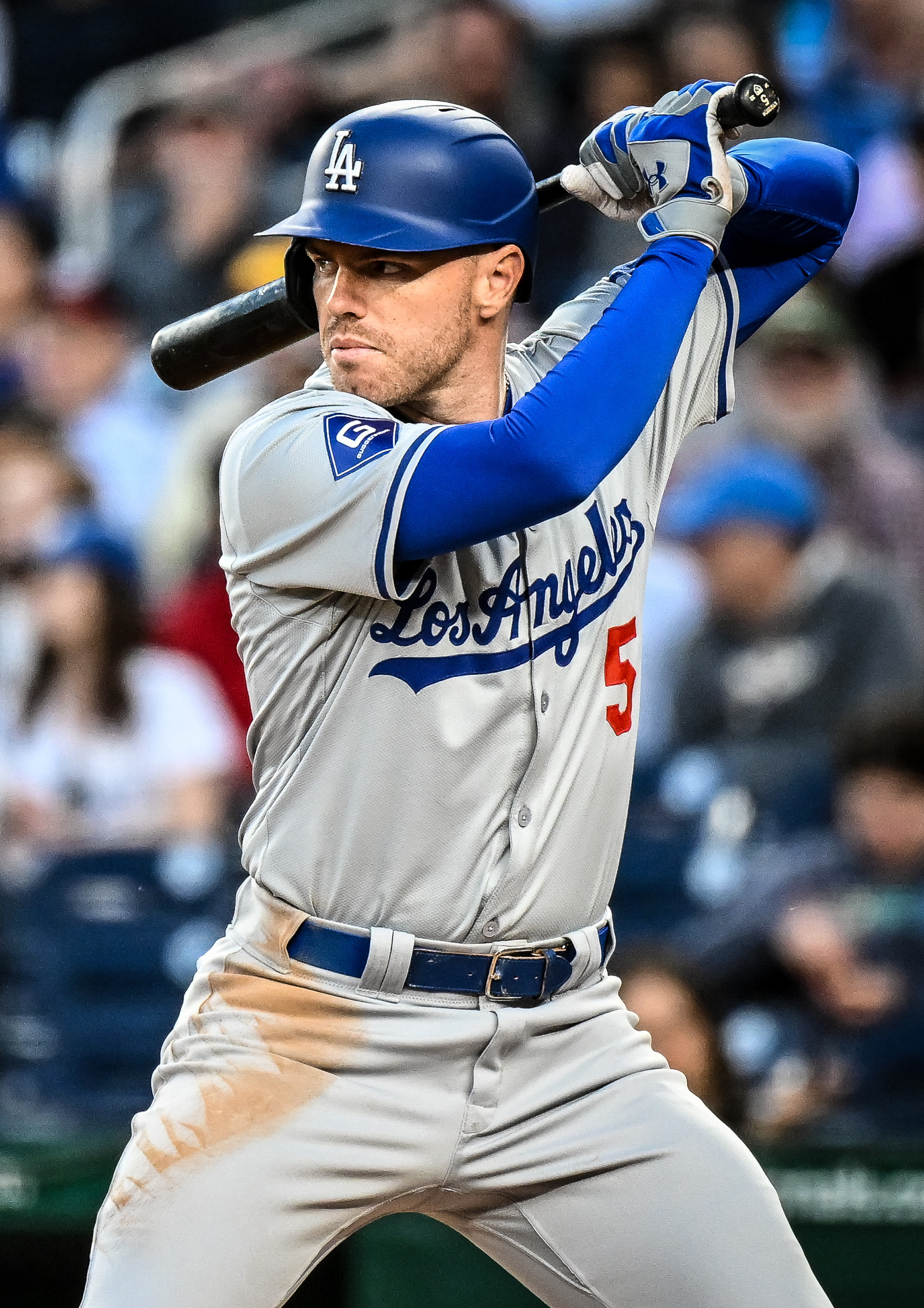
Freddie Freeman, the active leader and 61st all-time in career times on base.

- Stats updated through the 2026 season.

Rank	Player (2027 TOB)	TOB
1	Pete Rose	5,929
2	Barry Bonds	5,599
3	Ty Cobb*	5,532
4	Rickey Henderson*	5,343
5	Carl Yastrzemski*	5,304
6	Stan Musial*	5,282
7	Hank Aaron*	5,205
8	Tris Speaker*	4,998
9	Babe Ruth*	4,978
10	Eddie Collins*	4,891
11	Albert Pujols	4,880
12	Willie Mays*	4,806
13	Derek Jeter*	4,717
14	Ted Williams*	4,714
15	Mel Ott*	4,648
16	Alex Rodriguez	4,629
17	Eddie Murray*	4,606
18	Frank Robinson*	4,561
19	Honus Wagner*	4,508
20	Miguel Cabrera	4,506
21	Craig Biggio*	4,505
22	Paul Molitor*	4,460
	Rafael Palmeiro	4,460
24	Cap Anson*	4,451
25	Wade Boggs*	4,445
26	Joe Morgan*	4,422
27	Cal Ripken Jr.*	4,379
28	Dave Winfield*	4,351
29	Al Kaline*	4,339
30	Gary Sheffield	4,299
31	George Brett*	4,283
32	Paul Waner*	4,281
33	Lou Gehrig*	4,274
34	Chipper Jones*	4,256
35	Frank Thomas*	4,222
36	Ken Griffey Jr.*	4,174
37	Mickey Mantle*	4,161
38	Robin Yount*	4,156
39	Jim Thome*	4,144
40	Adrián Beltré*	4,111
	Jimmie Foxx*	4,111
42	Rod Carew*	4,096
43	Charlie Gehringer*	4,075
44	Luke Appling*	4,062
45	Reggie Jackson*	4,055
46	Rusty Staub	4,050
47	Rogers Hornsby*	4,016
48	Manny Ramirez	4,012
49	Bobby Abreu	3,979
50	Tim Raines*	3,977

Rank	Player (2027 TOB)	TOB
51	Tony Gwynn*	3,955
52	Jesse Burkett*	3,954
	Omar Vizquel	3,954
54	Harold Baines*	3,942
55	Todd Helton*	3,911
56	Nap Lajoie*	3,893
57	Dwight Evans	3,890
58	Darrell Evans	3,863
59	Carlos Beltrán*	3,860
60	Luis Gonzalez	3,857
61	**Freddie Freeman (0)**	3,852
62	Jeff Bagwell*	3,843
63	Fred McGriff*	3,834
64	Lou Brock*	3,833
65	David Ortiz*	3,829
66	Johnny Damon	3,822
67	Mike Schmidt*	3,820
68	Richie Ashburn*	3,815
69	Roberto Alomar*	3,806
70	Billy Williams*	3,799
71	Ichiro Suzuki*	3,791
72	Eddie Mathews*	3,785
73	Max Carey*	3,782
74	Brooks Robinson*	3,761
75	Sam Rice*	3,751
76	Sam Crawford*	3,744
77	Goose Goslin*	3,739
78	Jake Beckley*	3,737
79	Fred Clarke*	3,707
80	Tony Pérez*	3,700
81	Harmon Killebrew*	3,693
82	Harry Hooper*	3,678
83	Bill Dahlen	3,665
84	Roberto Clemente*	3,656
85	Frankie Frisch*	3,639
86	Willie McCovey*	3,625
87	Edgar Martínez*	3,619
88	George Davis*	3,614
89	Zack Wheat*	3,611
90	John Olerud	3,602
91	Chili Davis	3,589
92	Lou Whitaker	3,586
93	Willie Keeler*	3,585
94	Joey Votto	3,581
95	Eddie Yost	3,576
96	Al Simmons*	3,572
97	Ozzie Smith*	3,565
98	Jason Giambi	3,556
	Harry Heilmann*	3,556
100	Mark Grace	3,554
