= Dietram Scheufele =

American academic

Dietram A. Scheufele
- Occupation: Social scientist

Academic background
- Education: Johannes Gutenberg University Mainz; University of Wisconsin–Madison

Academic work
- Discipline: Communication science, PhD minor in political science
- Sub-discipline: Science communication, political communication, and artificial intelligence governance
- Institutions: Cornell University; University of Wisconsin–Madison; Morgridge Institute for Research
- Website: https://scheufele.info/

Dietram Arend Scheufele is a German-American social scientist and was the Vilas Distinguished Achievement Professor at the University of Wisconsin–Madison and the Morgridge Institute for Research. Prior to joining UW–Madison, Scheufele was a tenured faculty member at Cornell University. His research spans science communication, political communication, misinformation, and the governance of emerging technologies, including artificial intelligence. In 2026 he resigned from UW–Madison following a university investigation into relationships with students, and joined Arizona State University as a Foundation Professor.

== Education ==
Scheufele completed his undergraduate training in Publizistik (with minors in political science and business) at the Johannes Gutenberg University Mainz in Germany, before receiving an M.A. in Journalism & Mass Communication and a Ph.D. in Mass Communications, with a minor in political science, at the University of Wisconsin–Madison.

== Career ==
Scheufele began his academic career as a visiting assistant professor and then assistant professor at Cornell University in 1999, where he was promoted to associate professor with tenure in 2003, before joining the University of Wisconsin–Madison faculty as a full professor in 2004. Over his career, Scheufele has held visiting and fellowship appointments at Harvard University's John F. Kennedy School of Government, the University of Pennsylvania's Annenberg Public Policy Center, Dresden University of Technology, LMU Munich, the University of Münster, the University of Vienna, and the University of Utah.

In late 2024, the University of Wisconsin–Madison began investigating complaints by three students. Its September 2025 report found no violations of the university’s policies on harassment or hostile and intimidating behavior, but concluded that Scheufele had violated its consensual relationships policy and a faculty rule requiring professional honesty and integrity. In January 2026, Scheufele and the university reached a settlement that included his resignation effective August 15, 2026, without a final disciplinary decision on the non-Title IX allegations. Scheufele disputed the investigation’s findings and said the settlement involved no admission of wrongdoing by either party.

In August 2026, he joined Arizona State University's School of Social and Behavioral Sciences as a Foundation Professor.

== Research ==
Scheufele's publications include work on framing theory, participatory democracy, and the science of science communication.

== Awards ==
Scheufele is an elected member of the German National Academy of Science and Engineering, the American Academy of Arts & Sciences, and a lifetime associate of the U.S. National Research Council. Scheufele is also an elected fellow of the American Association for the Advancement of Science, the International Communication Association, and the Wisconsin Academy of Sciences, Arts & Letters. In 2024, he was named Harold Lasswell Fellow by the American Academy of Political and Social Science. and also received the Hilldale Award for distinguished contributions to teaching, research, and service in the social sciences at UW–Madison.
