= John Olerud =

American baseball player (born 1968)

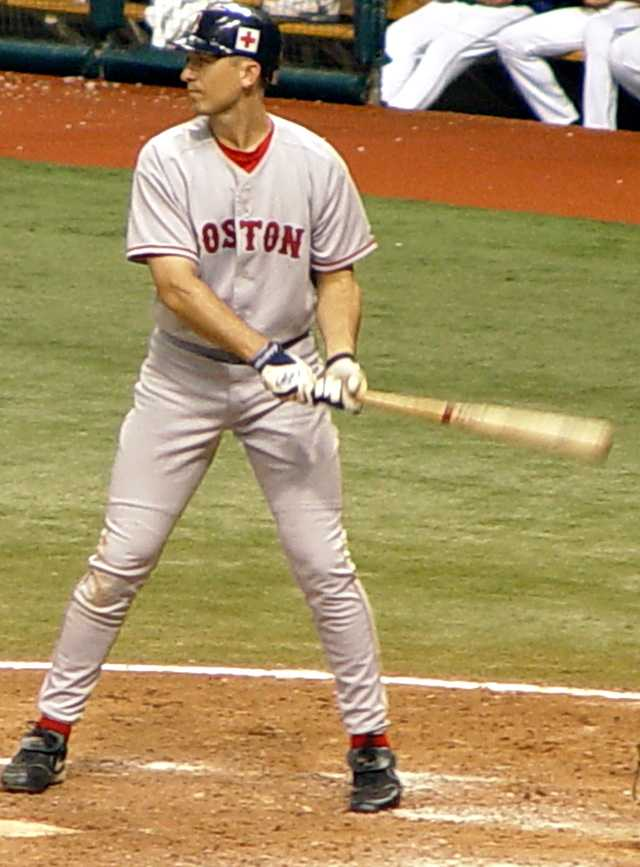
- Olerud with the Boston Red Sox in 2005
- First baseman
- Born: August 5, 1968 (age 58); Seattle, Washington, U.S.
- Batted: Left Threw: Left

MLB debut
- September 3, 1989, for the Toronto Blue Jays

Last MLB appearance
- October 2, 2005, for the Boston Red Sox

MLB statistics
- Batting average: .295
- Hits: 2,239
- Home runs: 255
- Runs batted in: 1,230
- Stats at Baseball Reference

Teams
- Toronto Blue Jays (1989–1996); New York Mets (1997–1999); Seattle Mariners (2000–2004); New York Yankees (2004); Boston Red Sox (2005)

Career highlights and awards
- 2× All-Star (1993, 2001); 2× World Series champion (1992, 1993); 3× Gold Glove Award (2000, 2002, 2003); AL batting champion (1993)

Member of the Canadian

Baseball Hall of Fame
- Induction: 2020

John Garrett Olerud Jr. (/ˈoʊləruːd/; born August 5, 1968) is an American former professional baseball player. He played in Major League Baseball as a first baseman from 1989 through 2005, most prominently as a member of the Toronto Blue Jays team that won two consecutive World Series championships in 1992 and 1993. He also played for the New York Mets, Seattle Mariners, New York Yankees, and Boston Red Sox.

A two-time All-Star, Olerud was a patient, productive hitter throughout his career, winning the American League batting title in 1993, and finishing as runner-up for the National League batting title in 1998. Olerud was also an excellent defensive first baseman, and won three Gold Glove Awards. In 1999, he appeared on the cover of Sports Illustrated titled "The Best Infield Ever?" along with Edgardo Alfonzo, Rey Ordóñez, and Robin Ventura, when he played for the Mets. Olerud was notable for wearing a helmet while on defense, due to his suffering from a brain aneurysm in college.

== Early life ==
Olerud was born to Lynda and John E. Olerud, a dermatologist and former baseball player born in Lisbon, North Dakota. Later from Federal Way, the elder Olerud played college baseball for the Washington State Cougars as a catcher and was the captain of the team that advanced to the semifinals of the College World Series in 1965. An All-American, he was named the outstanding WSU scholar-athlete as a senior. Selected by the California Angels in the 1965 amateur draft, he spent the next seven years studying medicine and playing minor league baseball, including for the AAA Winnipeg Whips in 1971.

At Interlake High School in Bellevue, Washington, the junior Olerud played varsity basketball, golf, and baseball for three years. As a senior in 1986, he led the Saints to a state championship as both a pitcher and a first baseman. At age 17, he was selected by the New York Mets in the 27th round of the June 1986 amateur draft, but chose to attend Washington State University.

== College baseball ==
Like his father, Olerud played college baseball for Washington State in Pullman under head coach Chuck "Bobo" Brayton. As a true freshman in 1987, he hit .414 with five home runs and 20 RBIs. As a pitcher, he went 8–2 with a 3.00 ERA and was an All-American. Washington State finished third in the six-team West I regional of the NCAA tournament.

In 1988, Olerud hit .464 with 23 home runs, 81 runs batted in, 108 hits, 204 total bases, and a .876 slugging percentage. As a pitcher, he had an undefeated 15–0 season, with a 2.49 ERA and 113 strikeouts. He was a consensus All-American as both a first baseman and pitcher and was named the Baseball America College Player of the Year. Washington State University again finished third in the six-team West I regional of the NCAA tournament.

Prior to his junior season in 1989, Olerud was running indoors on campus on January 11 when he collapsed; hospitalized in Pullman, he was airlifted to Spokane later in the day, accompanied by his father. He was diagnosed with a subarachnoid hemorrhage, which caused bleeding into the spinal column. He remained in the hospital for about two weeks after the seizure and lost 15 lb (6.8 kg), but was back in class by the end of January. A few weeks later in Seattle, further examinations revealed a brain aneurysm, and he underwent surgery in late February. From 1989 onward, he always wore a batting helmet while on defense.

Olerud returned to action for the Cougars in mid-April; he hit .359 with five home runs and 30 runs batted in during 78 plate appearances. On the mound, he posted a 3–2 record with a 6.68 ERA. He was a Pac-10 North All-League designated hitter. The Cougars again won the Pac-10 North title, but lost their first two games of the North tournament in blustery Spokane to end their year early.

In June, the Toronto Blue Jays selected him in the third round of the 1989 draft. Intending to return to the Cougars for his senior season, he again played summer ball with the Palouse Empire team in the Alaska League, while the Blue Jays negotiated a contract. He told teams prior to the draft that a very large bonus would be necessary for him to forego his senior year at Washington State. In late August, he signed with Toronto.

== Professional career ==
In a 17-season career through 2005 spanning 2,234 games, Olerud posted a .398 on-base percentage, 500 doubles, 255 home runs, 1,275 walks, 1,408 runs scored, 1,230 RBIs, 3,602 times on base, 96 sacrifice flies, and 157 intentional walks. He was also hit by pitches 88 times and grounded into 232 double plays during his career. He is one of only 26 players to ever hit for the cycle multiple times in their careers. Defensively, in 2,053 games at first base, he recorded a career .995 fielding percentage. He is a two-time All-Star and a member of two World Series-winning teams with the Blue Jays (1992–93).

Olerud jumped directly to the majors after a stellar career at Washington State, where he was a pitcher noted for his performance from 1987 to 1989. He had originally intended to return to Washington State for his senior year but agreed to sign with the Blue Jays only after they promised that he would report directly to Toronto. He was known for always wearing a batting helmet in the field as a precaution, due to the aneurysm he suffered at age twenty.

=== Toronto Blue Jays ===
Olerud broke into MLB with the Toronto Blue Jays in 1989, without ever playing in the minors. Prior to the 1990 season, he was named the #3 prospect in MLB by Baseball America. He was platooned by Jays' manager Cito Gaston for the first few years of his career, until 1992, when he became the team's full-time first baseman. In 1993, his breakout season, he led the American League in batting average (.363), intentional walks (33), times on base (321), on-base percentage (.473), OPS (1.072), and doubles (54, also a career-high), while posting career-highs in home runs (24), RBIs (107), runs (109), and hits (200). He flirted with a .400 batting average for much of the season, with his average staying higher than .400 as late as August 2.

Despite putting up solid numbers over the next several years, he failed to meet the high expectations placed upon him following his breakout performance in 1993. After the 1996 season, Olerud was battling veteran Joe Carter and up-and-comer Carlos Delgado for a spot at either first base or designated hitter. Delgado was young, had a bright future and a low salary, while Gaston preferred Carter to Olerud, feeling the latter wasn't aggressive enough at the plate. Therefore, Olerud was traded, along with cash, to the New York Mets on December 20 for Robert Person.

=== New York Mets ===
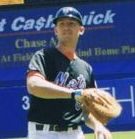
Olerud with the Mets at Shea Stadium in 1999

With the Mets, he set a team record in 1998 by reaching base at least twice in 12 straight starts. Olerud set team single-season records for batting average (.354), on-base percentage (.447) and runs created (138) in 1998. He was in the race for the National League batting title until the final day of the season, when Larry Walker edged him out with a .363 average. In the 1999 campaign, Olerud appeared on the cover of the September 6 issue of Sports Illustrated, along with fellow Mets infielders Edgardo Alfonzo, Rey Ordóñez, and Robin Ventura. The magazine raised the debate as to whether the four talented fielders comprised the best defensive infield in major league history. He set Mets records for most walks (125) and times on base (309) in a season that year.

=== Seattle Mariners ===
Following the 1999 season, Olerud returned home, agreeing to a three-year, $20 million contract with the Seattle Mariners. In 2000, he amassed 45 doubles, 102 walks, 10 sacrifice flies and 11 intentional walks. He was an important part of the Mariners' historic 2001 season in which they tied the record for most wins in a major league baseball season with 116. Olerud contributed to the effort with a .401 on-base percentage, 94 walks, 272 times on base and 19 intentional walks in 159 games. In 2002, he recorded a .403 on-base percentage, 39 doubles, 98 walks, 269 times on base and led the American League with 12 sacrifice flies. In 2003, he collected another 84 walks. Olerud also earned all three of his Gold Glove Awards while playing first base for Seattle in 2000, 2002, and 2003. In mid-July 2004, the Mariners were in last place in the American League West Division and Olerud was designated for assignment; he was hitting .245 with five homers and a trade was attempted but not completed; he was released the following week.

=== New York Yankees ===
About a week after his release, Olerud was signed in early August by the New York Yankees to fill a void left at first base by the injury of Jason Giambi. Less than two weeks later, the Yankees visited Seattle to play the Mariners. Olerud started the second game on Saturday, August 14; his first time up, Mariners catcher Dan Wilson went to the mound to have a "conference" with pitcher Jamie Moyer. This gave time for about a minute-long standing ovation for Olerud from the Seattle fans. His American League Championship Series was cut short when he was forced to leave due to an injured foot in Game 3. Olerud pinch-hit in Game 7 but struck out after a lengthy at-bat against Pedro Martínez, making a rare relief appearance; it was Olerud's last at-bat as a Yankee.

=== Boston Red Sox ===
On May 2, 2005, the Boston Red Sox and Olerud agreed to terms on a minor league contract. He had been recovering from surgery in November 2004 to repair torn ligaments in his left foot. Initially, Olerud reported to the club's spring training complex in Fort Myers, Florida. He was added to Boston's 25-man roster on May 27, sharing time at first base with Kevin Millar and batting in the middle of the lineup (including several starts in the clean-up spot).

=== Retirement ===
Following the 2005 season, Olerud announced his retirement from baseball on December 6. At the time, his 2,239 career hits represented the 143rd-highest total in major league history. His career .398 on base percentage ranks 65th, and his 500 doubles are 44th.

In 2007, Olerud was inducted into the National College Baseball Hall of Fame. In 2013, the Cougars retired his number 18 jersey, the first player to receive the honor in program history. In 2016, Olerud was named Pac-12 Player of the Century when the conference released its All-Century Baseball team. He was named to the Canadian Baseball Hall of Fame in the Class of 2020, although he was not inducted until 2023. The collegiate John Olerud Two-Way Player of the Year Award is named after him.

== Personal life ==
Olerud became an evangelical Christian in 1990. Olerud lives with his wife, Kelly, who was a high school classmate, and their children (one son and one daughter) in the Seattle suburb of Clyde Hill. Another daughter, Jordan, died at age 19 in 2020 from complications of a unique chromosomal disorder called tri-some 2p, 5p-. Of Norwegian descent, Olerud is a cousin of retired MLB player Dale Sveum.

== See also ==
- List of baseball players who went directly to Major League Baseball
- List of Major League Baseball annual doubles leaders
- List of Major League Baseball career assists as a first baseman leaders
- List of Major League Baseball career bases on balls leaders
- List of Major League Baseball career double plays as a first baseman leaders
- List of Major League Baseball career doubles leaders
- List of Major League Baseball career hits leaders
- List of Major League Baseball career home run leaders
- List of Major League Baseball career putouts as a first baseman leaders
- List of Major League Baseball career runs batted in leaders
- List of Major League Baseball career runs scored leaders
- List of Major League Baseball career times on base leaders
- List of Major League Baseball players to hit for the cycle
- List of Washington State University people
- Toronto Blue Jays award winners and league leaders

Awards and achievements
Preceded by Frank Thomas; Paul Molitor	American League Player of the Month; April 1993; June 1993	Succeeded by Paul Molitor; Rafael Palmeiro
Preceded by Alex Rodriguez; Damion Easley	Hitting for the cycle September 11, 1997; June 16, 2001	Succeeded by Mike Blowers; Jeff Bagwell
