= Melissa Skala =

American biomedical engineer

Melissa Caroline Skala
- Education: Duke University (PhD); University of Wisconsin-Madison (MS); Washington State University
- Scientific career
- Workplaces: Vanderbilt University; Morgridge Institute for Research
- Thesis: Multiphoton microscopy, fluorescence lifetime imaging and optical spectroscopy for the diagnosis of neoplasia. (2007)
- Website: Optical Microscopy in Medicine Lab

Melissa Caroline Skala is an American biomedical engineer who is a professor at the Morgridge Institute for Research. Her research considers photonics-based technologies for personalised medical therapies. She is a Fellow of The Optical Society, SPIE and American Institute for Medical and Biological Engineering.

== Early life and education ==
As a child, Skala wanted to be an astronaut. She eventually studied physics at undergraduate at Washington State University, and during a summer research programme in biomedical optics decided to switch her attention to the emerging field of biomedical engineering. Skala graduated with a master's degree in biomedical engineering from the University of Wisconsin–Madison in 2004. Skala was a graduate student at Duke University, where she developed fluorescence-lifetime imaging microscopy (FLIM) for the diagnosis of neoplasia. After graduating, Skala was made a postdoctoral research fellow at Duke University.

== Research and career ==
In 2010 Skala was appointed an assistant professor at Vanderbilt University. She spent six years at Vanderbilt before joining the University of Wisconsin–Madison in 2016. Skala is Director of the Morgridge Institute for Research Optical Microscopy in Medicine Lab. Her research makes use of photonics-based technologies to monitor the function and interaction of immune cells. In particular, Skala develops new treatments for cancer patients through the use of biopsies and autofluorescence. She has shown that non-invasive, label-free fluorescence imaging can search through a patient's T cells, identify which might be the most useful for immunotherapy.

She has specialised in the treatment of pancreatic cancer, taking biopsies from tumours and creating organoids for laboratory-based investigations. These organoids are optically accessible, meaning Skala can evaluate the efficacy of different drugs and identify the optimised treatment regimes for specific patients. Skala makes use of optical coherence tomography as an imaging tool during brain surgery and in the treatment of liver cancer.

Alongside personalised treatment regimes, Skala has studied disparities in pancreatic cancer treatment, and whether ethnicity, location and insurance coverage impacts health outcomes. She has shown that women, Black and Asian patients are less likely receive medical treatment than their white male counterparts. Skala has developed organ-on-a-chip devices to study pulsatile flow and how it impacts cardiovascular disease. She is particularly interested in better understanding the irregularities in endothelial cells that occur in babies with heart defects.

== Awards and honours ==
- 2016: National Science Foundation CAREER Award
- 2018: UW Carbone Cancer Center Ride Scholar
- 2018: Wisconsin Alumni Research Foundation
- 2019: Elected Fellow of The Optical Society
- 2019: Elected Fellow of SPIE
- 2019: Elected Fellow of American Institute for Medical and Biological Engineering

== Selected publications ==
- Skala, M. C.; Riching, K. M.; Gendron-Fitzpatrick, A.; Eickhoff, J.; Eliceiri, K. W.; White, J. G.; Ramanujam, N. (2007-11-27). "In vivo multiphoton microscopy of NADH and FAD redox states, fluorescence lifetimes, and cellular morphology in precancerous epithelia". Proceedings of the National Academy of Sciences. 104 (49): 19494–19499. Bibcode:2007PNAS..10419494S. doi:10.1073/pnas.0708425104. ISSN 0027-8424. PMC 2148317. PMID 18042710.
- Skala, Melissa C.; Squirrell, Jayne M.; Vrotsos, Kristin M.; Eickhoff, Jens C.; Gendron-Fitzpatrick, Annette; Eliceiri, Kevin W.; Ramanujam, Nirmala (2005-02-15). "Multiphoton Microscopy of Endogenous Fluorescence Differentiates Normal, Precancerous, and Cancerous Squamous Epithelial Tissues". Cancer Research. 65 (4): 1180–1186. doi:10.1158/0008-5472.CAN-04-3031. ISSN 0008-5472. PMC 4189807. PMID 15735001.
- Walsh, Alex J.; Cook, Rebecca S.; Manning, H. Charles; Hicks, Donna J.; Lafontant, Alec; Arteaga, Carlos L.; Skala, Melissa C. (2013-10-15). "Optical Metabolic Imaging Identifies Glycolytic Levels, Subtypes, and Early-Treatment Response in Breast Cancer". Cancer Research. 73 (20): 6164–6174. doi:10.1158/0008-5472.CAN-13-0527. ISSN 0008-5472. PMC 3801432. PMID 24130112.
