= Amy Mazur =

American political scientist

- Born: Amy Gale Mazur; May 5, 1962 (age 64)

Amy Gale Mazur (born May 5, 1962) is an American political scientist and professor at Washington State University, as well as an associate researcher at the Centre d’Études Européennes at Sciences Po, Paris.

== Education ==
Mazur attended University of Caen Normandy in 1982-1983 and attained her B.A. at Colby College in 1984. She completed graduate work at Sciences Po in 1986-1987. She obtained her M.A. in 1986 and in 1992 her Ph.D. in Politics and French Studies at New York University.

== Career ==
Mazur's research and teaching interests focus on comparative feminist policy, women’s policy agencies/state feminism, feminist policy implementation, conceptualization and mixed methods, and French politics. She is the co-convener of the Gender Equality Policy in Practice Network (GEPP) and the associate editor of French Politics. She is one of the founders of the Research Network on Gender Politics and the State (RNGS). From 2006 to 2014, Mazur was coeditor of Political Research Quarterly, with Cornell Clayton. In 2015, she was a fellow at the Birkbeck Institute for the Humanities; in 2009, a visiting fellow at the Institute for Advanced Study and the University of Warwick; and in Fall 2001 the Marie-Jahoda Professor of International Feminist Studies at Ruhr University Bochum. In 2005–2006, she was an expert for the United Nations for the Expert Group Meeting on Equal Participation of Women and Men in Decision-making Processes and rapporteur of the final meeting report. Mazur has also been consulted by the European Union, the World Bank, the International Labour Organization and the Obama Administration. She has received research grants from the National Science Foundation, the European Science Foundation, the French Ministry of Social Affairs and the Norwegian National Science Foundation.

== Publications ==
=== Books ===
- The Oxford University Press Handbook on French Politics. Edited with Robert Elgie and Emiliano Grossman. 2016.
- The Politics of State Feminism: Innovation in Comparative Research. With Dorothy McBride and the participation of Joni Lovenduski, Joyce Outshoorn, Birgit Sauer and Marila Guadagnini. Temple University Press. 2010. Chapter 10 translated into Croatian and published in Marjeta Šinko (ed.) 2015. Žene i politika:feministička politička znanost Zagreb: Biblioteka Politička misao.
- Politics, Gender, and Concepts: Theory and Methodology. Edited with Gary Goertz. Cambridge University Press. 2008.
- Theorizing Feminist Policy. London: Oxford University Press. 2002.
- State Feminism, Women’s Movements, and Job Training: Making Democracies Work in the Global Economy. Edited. New York: Routledge. 2001.
- Gender Bias and the State: Symbolic Reform at Work in Fifth Republic France. Pitt Series in Policy and Institutional Studies. Pittsburgh, PA: University of Pittsburgh Press. 1995.
- Comparative State Feminism. Edited with Dorothy McBride Stetson. Thousand Oaks, CA: Sage d by Emanuel Lombardo, Petra Meier and Mieke Verloo. Special Issue for Journal of Women, Politics and Policy. 2015.

=== Government reports ===
- Background Paper for WDR12 on Gender Machineries Worldwide. With Dorothy McBride. World Bank. March, 2011.
- Presentation of Final Expert Group Meeting Report, Equal Participation of Women and Men in Decision-making Processes, with Particular Emphasis on Political Participation and Leadership. At the Fiftieth Session of the Commission on the Status of Women and NGO Consultation, United Nations. February 27–29, 2006.

== Awards ==
- College of Arts and Sciences, Washington State University, Award for Outstanding Achievement in International Teaching, Research and Creative Activities. 2014.
- College of Liberal Arts, Washington State University, Excellence in Professional Service Award. Spring, 2011.
- Outstanding Professional Achievement Award, Midwest Political Science Association, Women's Caucus for Political Science, 2011.
- Nominated for Outstanding Mentor of the Year Award, Washington State University. 2006 and 2007.
- Nominated for the 2003 Washington State University Woman of the Year, Women of Distinction Awards.
- Nominated for a Visiting Professorship at the Centre for the Advancement of Women in Politics, Queens University Belfast. Spring 2001.
- Nominated for the Marian Smith Faculty Achievement Award, WSU. 1995.
- Georges Lavau Dissertation Award, Conference Group on French Politics and Society, American Political Science Association, 1993.
- Graduate Research Institute Fellow, Columbia University, Paris, 1988-1989.
- Research Fellow, Fondation Nationale des Sciences Politiques, Paris, 1988-1989.
