= Abelsonite =

Organic mineral, a nickel porphyrine derivative

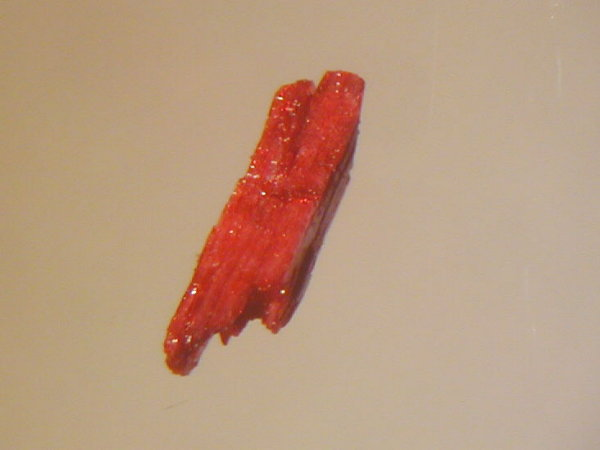
- Abelsonite from the Green River Formation, Uintah County, Utah, US

General
- Category: Organic minerals
- Formula: C_{31}H_{32}N_{4}Ni
- IMA symbol: Abl
- Strunz classification: 10.CA.20
- Dana classification: 50.4.9.1
- Crystal system: Triclinic
- Space group: P1̅ (No. 2)
- Unit cell: a = 8.508, b = 11.185 Å c = 7.299 [Å], α = 90.85° β = 114.1°, γ = 79.99° Z = 1

Identification
- Color: Pink-purple, dark greyish purple, pale purplish red, reddish brown
- Cleavage: Probable on {111̅}
- Fracture: Fragile
- Mohs scale hardness: 2–3
- Luster: Adamantine, sub-metallic
- Streak: Pink
- Diaphaneity: Semitransparent
- Specific gravity: 1.45
- Optical properties: Biaxial
- Ultraviolet fluorescence: Non-fluorescent
- Absorption spectra: Strong reddish brown to reddish black

Abelsonite is a nickel porphyrin mineral with chemical formula C_{31}H_{32}N_{4}Ni. It was discovered in 1969 in the U.S. State of Utah and described in 1975. The mineral is named after geochemist Philip H. Abelson. It is the only known crystalline geoporphyrin.

== Description ==
Abelsonite is semitransparent and pink-purple, dark greyish purple, pale purplish red, or reddish brown in color. The mineral occurs as thin laths or plates or small aggregates up to 1 cm (0.39 in). The mineral is soluble in benzene and acetone and is insoluble in water, dilute hydrochloric acid, and dilute nitric acid.

== Occurrence and formation ==
The mineral is known only from the Parachute Creek Member of the Green River Formation. It has been known from the Uinta Basin in Utah since its discovery and from the Piceance Basin in Colorado since 1985. Abelsonite occurs in association with albite, analcime, dolomite, mica, orthoclase, pyrite, and quartz.

Abelsonite is a secondary mineral that formed in fractures, vugs, and bedding planes of oil shale. The mineral probably formed from diagenesis of chlorophyll, likely chlorophyll a, which was transported as an aqueous solution into a favorable geologic setting. Alternative source are Methanogen Archea, where close compound is used in Cofactor F430 critical for methane production.

In 2003, abelsonite was fully synthesized for the first time.

== Structure ==
Structure of abelsonite

In 1989, abelsonite was the only known geoporphyrin to have a crystalline structure. (Note: So far as the authors were aware) Most geoporphyrins occur as a series of homologues spanning a large range of carbon numbers. The porphyrin which comprises abelsonite is common, but it does not usually occur in isolation from other porphyrins.

The mineral is a deoxophylloerythroetioporphyrin (DPEP), with nickel occupying the center of the porphyrin ring. Most of the mineral consists of a C_{31} porphyrin with small quantities of a C_{30} norisomer. The mineral crystallizes in the triclinic crystal system.

== History ==
The mineral was first noted in 1969 in a core sample made by the Western Oil Shale Corporation in Uintah County, Utah. It was described in 1975 in the journal Geological Society of America Abstracts with Programs. The mineral was named after Philip H. Abelson (1913–2004), a long-time editor of the journal Science, for his work in organic geochemistry.

Type specimens are held in The Natural History Museum in London and the National Museum of Natural History in Washington, D.C.

== See also ==
- List of minerals
