= Fargo College =

Educational institution in North Dakota

Fargo College was a coeducational institution in Fargo, North Dakota that operated from 1888 to 1922.

== History ==
Fargo College was founded in 1888 under the auspices of the Congregational Church. At the close of 1919, there were 32 professors and instructors, and 602 students. The president of the college was W. H. Howard.

Fargo College closed in 1922 due to financial problems. Its buildings have mostly been demolished, except for Watson Hall (the music building). An extensive collection of the Fargo College records is held by the North Dakota State University Archives.

== Notable alumni and faculty ==
- Mary Elizabeth Perley (1863–?), American educator and author
- Otis Hamilton Lee (1903–1948), Rhodes Scholar, Professor of Philosophy and author.
- John C. Early, American colonial administrator in the Philippines.
