= Paul Ahlquist =

American virologist

- Education: Iowa State University; University of Wisconsin–Madison
- Scientific career
- Workplaces: University of Wisconsin–Madison; Morgridge Institute for Research

Paul Ahlquist is an American virologist who is Professor of Oncology, Molecular Virology, and Plant Pathology at the University of Wisconsin–Madison. He is the Associate Director of Basic Sciences at the University of Wisconsin Carbone Cancer Center and the Director of the John and Jeanne Rowe Center for Research in Virology at the Morgridge Institute for Research.

== Education ==
Ahlquist earned his B.S. in physics from Iowa State University and his Ph.D. in biophysics from the University of Wisconsin–Madison. His research is focused on the gene expression of RNA viruses.

== Honors and awards ==
Ahlquist was admitted to the National Academy of Sciences in 1993 and was a Howard Hughes Medical Institute (HHMI) investigator from 1997 to 2021.

== Research ==
His work at the University of Wisconsin–Madison and the Morgridge Institute for Research focuses on molecular mechanisms of viral replication, host interactions, and oncogenesis.

== Select publications ==
- Zhan, H; Unchwaniwala, N; Rebolledo-Viveros, A; Pennington, J; Horswill, M; Broadberry, R; Myers, J; den Boon, JA; Grant, T; Ahlquist, P (2023). "Nodavirus RNA replication crown architecture reveals proto-crown precursor and viral protein A conformational switching". Proc Natl Acad Sci U S A. 120 (5) e2217412120. Bibcode:2023PNAS..12017412Z. doi:10.1073/pnas.2217412120. PMC 9945985. PMID 36693094.
- den Boon, J. A.; Zhan, H.; Unchwaniwala, N.; Horswill, M.; Slavik, K.; Pennington, J.; Navine, A.; Ahlquist, P. (2022). "Multifunctional Protein A Is the Only Viral Protein Required for Nodavirus RNA Replication Crown Formation". Viruses. 14 (12): 2711. doi:10.3390/v14122711. PMC 9788154. PMID 36560715.
- Evans, E. L.; Pocock, G. M.; Einsdorf, G.; Behrens, R. T.; Dobson, E. T. A.; Wiedenmann, M.; Birkhold, C.; Ahlquist, P.; Eliceiri, K. W.; Sherer, N. M. (2022). "HIV RGB: Automated Single-Cell Analysis of HIV-1 Rev-Dependent RNA Nuclear Export and Translation Using Image Processing in KNIME". Viruses. 14 (5): 903. doi:10.3390/v14050903. PMC 9145009.
- Albright, E. R.; Morrison, K.; Ranganathan, P.; Carter, D. M.; Nishikiori, M.; Lee, J. H.; Slayton, M. D.; Ahlquist, P.; Terhune, S. S.; Kalejta, R. F. (2022). "Human cytomegalovirus lytic infection inhibits replication-dependent histone synthesis and requires stem loop binding protein function". Proceedings of the National Academy of Sciences of the United States of America. 119 (14) e2122174119. Bibcode:2022PNAS..11922174A. doi:10.1073/pnas.2122174119. PMC 9169081. PMID 35344424.
- Benner, B. E.; Bruce, J. W.; Kentala, J. R.; Murray, M.; Becker, J. T.; Garcia-Miranda, P.; Ahlquist, P.; Butcher, S. E.; Sherer, N. M. (2022). "Perturbing HIV-1 Ribosomal Frameshifting Frequency Reveals a cis Preference for Gag-Pol Incorporation into Assembling Virions". Journal of Virology. 96 (1): e01349-21. doi:10.1128/JVI.01349-21. PMC 8754204. PMID 34643428.
- Unchwaniwala, N.; Zhan, H.; den Boon, J. A.; Ahlquist, P. (2021). "Cryo-electron microscopy of nodavirus RNA replication organelles illuminates positive-strand RNA virus genome replication". Current Opinion in Virology. 51: 74–79. doi:10.1016/j.coviro.2021.09.008. PMC 8504867. PMID 34601307.
- Unchwaniwala, N.; Zhan, H.; Pennington, J.; Horswill, M.; den Boon, J. A.; Ahlquist, P. (2020). "Subdomain cryo-EM structure of nodaviral replication protein A crown complex provides mechanistic insights into RNA genome replication". Proceedings of the National Academy of Sciences of the United States of America. 117 (31): 18680–18691. Bibcode:2020PNAS..11718680U. doi:10.1073/pnas.2006165117. PMC 7414174. PMID 32690711.
- Nishikiori, M.; Ahlquist, P. (2018). "Organelle luminal dependence of (+)strand RNA virus replication reveals a hidden druggable target". Science Advances. 4 (1) eaap8258. Bibcode:2018SciA....4.8258N. doi:10.1126/sciadv.aap8258. PMC 5787378. PMID 29387794.
- den Boon, J. A.; Pyeon, D.; Wang, S. S.; Horswill, M.; Schiffman, M.; Sherman, M.; Zuna, R. E.; Wang, Z.; Hewitt, S. M.; Pearson, R.; Schott, M.; Chung, L.; He, Q.; Lambert, P.; Walker, J.; Newton, M. A.; Wentzensen, N.; Ahlquist, P. (2015). "Molecular transitions from papillomavirus infection to cervical precancer and cancer: Role of stromal estrogen receptor signaling". Proceedings of the National Academy of Sciences of the United States of America. 112 (25): E3255–E3264. Bibcode:2015PNAS..112E3255D. doi:10.1073/pnas.1509322112. PMC 4485108. PMID 26056290.
- Giménez-Barcons, M.; Alves-Rodrigues, I.; Jungfleisch, J.; Van Wynsberghe, P. M.; Ahlquist, P.; Díez, J. (2013). "The Cellular Decapping Activators LSm1, Pat1, and Dhh1 Control the Ratio of Subgenomic to Genomic Flock House Virus RNAs". J. Virol. 87 (11): 6192–6200. doi:10.1128/JVI.03327-12. PMC 3648113. PMID 23536653.
- Seidel, S.; Bruce, J.; Leblanc, M.; Lee, K.-F.; Fan, H.; Ahlquist, P.; Young, J. A. T. (2013). "ZASC1 Knockout Mice Exhibit an Early Bone Marrow-Specific Defect in Murine Leukemia Virus Replication". Virol. J. 10 (1): 130. doi:10.1186/1743-422X-10-130. PMC 3654992. PMID 23617998.
- Diaz, A.; Ahlquist, P. (2012). "Role of Host Reticulon Proteins in Rearranging Membranes for Positive-Strand RNA Virus Replication". Curr. Opin. Microbiol. 15 (4): 519–524. doi:10.1016/j.mib.2012.04.007. PMC 3670673. PMID 22621853.
- Diaz, A.; Gallei, A.; Ahlquist, P. (2012). "Bromovirus RNA Replication Compartment Formation Requires Concerted Action of 1a's Self-Interacting RNA Capping and Helicase Domains". J. Virol. 86 (2): 821–834. doi:10.1128/JVI.05684-11. PMC 3255829. PMID 22090102.
- Huang, H.-S.; Pyeon, D.; Pearce, S. M.; Lank, S. M.; Griffin, L. M.; Ahlquist, P.; Lambert, P. F. (2012). "Novel Antivirals Inhibit Early Steps in HPV Infection". Antiviral Res. 93 (2): 280–287. doi:10.1016/j.antiviral.2011.12.007. PMC 3266476. PMID 22197636.
- Wen, Z.; Pyeon, D.; Wang, Y.; Lambert, P.; Xu, W.; Ahlquist, P. (2012). "Orphan Nuclear Receptor PNR/NR2E3 Stimulates p53 Functions by Enhancing p53 Acetylation". Mol. Cell. Biol. 32: 26–35. doi:10.1128/MCB.05513-11. PMC 3255696. PMID 22025681.
- Zhang, J.; Diaz, A.; Mao, L.; Ahlquist, P.; Wang, X. (2012). "Host Acyl Coenzyme A Binding Protein Regulates Replication Complex Assembly and Activity of a Positive-Strand RNA Virus". J. Virol. 86 (9): 5110–5121. doi:10.1128/JVI.06701-11. PMC 3347339. PMID 22345450.
- Gancarz, B. L.; Hao, L.; He, Q.; Newton, M. A.; Ahlquist, P. (2011). "Systematic Identification of Novel, Essential Host Genes Affecting Bromovirus RNA Replication". PLOS ONE. 6 (8) e23988. Bibcode:2011PLoSO...623988G. doi:10.1371/journal.pone.0023988. PMC 3161824. PMID 21915247.
- Scholthof, K.-B. G.; Adkins, S.; Czosnek, H.; Palukaitis, P.; Jacquot, E.; Hohn, T.; Hohn, B.; Saunders, K.; Candresse, T.; Ahlquist, P.; Hemenway, C.; Foster, G. D. (2011). "Top 10 Plant Viruses in Molecular Plant Pathology". Mol. Plant Pathol. 12 (9): 938–954. Bibcode:2011MolPP..12..938S. doi:10.1111/j.1364-3703.2011.00752.x. PMC 6640423. PMID 22017770.
- Wang, X.; Diaz, A.; Hao, L.; Gancarz, B.; den Boon, J. A.; Ahlquist, P. (2011). "Intersection of the Multivesicular Body Pathway and Lipid Homeostasis in RNA Replication by a Positive-Strand RNA Virus". J. Virol. 85 (11): 5494–5503. doi:10.1128/JVI.02031-10. PMC 3094957. PMID 21430061.
