= Murder of Deborah Gardner =

American murder victim who was killed in 1976 in Tonga

Deborah Gardner was a 23-year-old American Peace Corps volunteer who was murdered by another volunteer, Dennis Priven, in the Polynesian island kingdom of Tonga in 1976. The handling of Priven's trial brought much criticism upon the Peace Corps.

== Background ==
Deborah Gardner was a recent graduate of Washington State University when she joined the Peace Corps. After completing training, she was assigned to teach science and home economics to high school students in Nuku'alofa, the capital city of Tonga. There she met Dennis Priven, another Peace Corps volunteer who had come to Tonga the previous year.

Priven became infatuated with Gardner, but she did not return his feelings. This became evident when Gardner accepted a dinner invitation from Priven. He had anticipated a romantic evening, but after he attempted to give Gardner an expensive gift, she stated that she felt uncomfortable and left. Despite this, Priven continued to pursue her. Gardner tried to avoid him, going as far as requesting a transfer to another island. Priven, meanwhile, tried to get his Peace Corps service extended for another year so he could stay near Gardner. Tonga's Peace Corps director, Mary George, denied both requests.

A few months before Priven's two-year Peace Corps service was completed, a party was held for all the volunteers on Tonga. Both Priven and Gardner attended. Many volunteers became intoxicated, including Gardner. She left the party with a male volunteer, who escorted her to her house. This was witnessed by Priven, who became jealous.

== Murder ==
On 14 October 1976, less than a week after the party, a local Tongan man heard screams coming from Gardner's house and rushed to the scene. He reported seeing Priven attempting to drag Gardner out of the house. As soon as Priven noticed the witness, he released Gardner and fled on a bicycle. Gardner later died from 22 stab wounds, but not before she was able to name her assailant. Priven attempted suicide by taking Darvon and cutting his wrists, but changed his mind and sought out a friend to accompany him to the police to turn himself in. He was charged with murder and tried in Tonga.

== Trial ==
At trial, the prosecution claimed that Priven killed Gardner in anger over his rejection. For his defense, Priven was represented by lawyer Clive Edwards, who would later become deputy Prime Minister of Tonga. A psychiatrist hired by the Peace Corps testified that Priven was a paranoid schizophrenic who proclaimed himself to be Gardner's Jesus Christ and that Gardner was possessed by the devil. Priven was found not guilty by reason of insanity.

Despite the verdict, the Tongan justice system was reluctant to release Priven. After receiving a letter from the U.S. State Department promising he would be involuntarily committed to a mental hospital, Tonga handed him over to the U.S. government. When Priven arrived in the U.S., however, Priven requested and was granted release, as the government discovered it had no legal grounds to hold him.

Under pressure from his family and the Peace Corps, Priven ultimately agreed to a psychiatric evaluation. He was interviewed by a psychiatrist associated with the hospital where the government had intended him to serve his commitment. His diagnosis fit the prosecution's theory; Priven had suffered a "situational psychosis" after being rejected by Gardner. Since the diagnosis determined that Priven was not schizophrenic, he could not be committed. Priven returned to New York City after his release and worked for the Social Security Administration until his retirement. Priven died on April 1, 2023.

== Criticism ==
The Peace Corps has been criticized for its handling of the murder, particularly since a book on the case was published in 2005, acquainting a wider public with the details. Criticisms include that Priven's defense in Tonga was supplied by the Peace Corps, that the Peace Corps allegedly went to great efforts to cover up the incident, and that Priven was not suffering from a psychiatric disorder that would have allowed him to mount a successful psychiatric defense in a U.S. court.

In 2005, the U.S. Attorney's Office in Seattle looked into the possibility of bringing charges against Priven for the murder, but concluded that he could not be tried in any jurisdiction in the U.S. Although a 1994 law allows prosecutors to bring charges against an American citizen who kills another American citizen while overseas, and the PATRIOT Act allows U.S. Courts to try Americans for crimes they may have committed while overseas, neither of these laws were in effect in 1976 and they cannot therefore be applied retroactively to the Gardner murder case.

Although Priven's psychiatrist at his trial testified that he suffered from latent paranoid schizophrenia, a panel of psychiatrists who discussed the murder as a case study in 2005 concluded that Priven was probably suffering from narcissistic personality disorder, which manifests itself as an obsessive involvement with one's own interests and a lack of empathy for others. They further concluded that had Priven been charged in an American court, he would not have been able to mount a successful defense "by reason of insanity."
