= Sue Peabody =

American historian

Sue Peabody is an American historian and Meyer Distinguished Professor of history at Washington State University Vancouver. She is the author of "There Are No Slaves in France": The Political Culture of Race and Slavery in the Ancien Regime (Oxford, 1996). She is the co-editor, with Tyler Stovall, of The Color of Liberty: Histories of Race in France (Duke University Press, 2003) and, with Keila Grinberg, Slavery, Freedom and the Law in the Atlantic World (Bedford, 2007).

== Awards and honors ==
Her book, Madeleine's Children: Family, Freedom, Secrets, and Lies in France's Indian Ocean Colonies (Oxford University Press, 2017) won three prizes: 2018 Society for French Historical Studies' David H. Pinkney Prize for "the most distinguished book in French history, published for the first time the preceding year by a citizen of the United States or Canada"; 2018 French Colonial Historical Society's Mary Alice and Philip Boucher Prize for "the best book dealing with the French colonial experience from the 16th century to 1815"; and the 2018 Western Association of Women Historians' Frances Richardson Keller-Sierra Prize for "the best monograph in the field of history published by a WAWH member."
