= Mieke Verloo =

Dutch political scientist

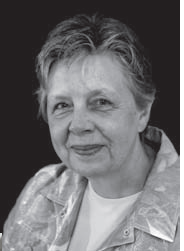

Mieke Verloo (born 1950) is a Dutch political scientist and a professor of comparative politics and inequality issues at Radboud University in the Netherlands, and non-residential permanent fellow at the IWM, Institute for Human Sciences in Vienna. She is considered one of the leading directors of scientific research on feminist politics and opposition to gender+ equality in Europe. In 2015 she won the ECPG Gender and Politics Career Achievement Award.

== Early life and education ==
Verloo was born in 1950. She graduated from Radboud University Nijmegen with a B.A. in sociology. She completed an M.A. in urban planning there in 1975, and then in 1992 received a Ph.D. in policy sciences.

== Career ==
Verloo has completed positions as a research assistant, researcher, staff member research policy, lecturer of staff member internationalization in Nijmegen, Tilburg, Rijswijk, The Hague and Utrecht (1975–2001). Verloo has also been a research director in IWM Vienna, MAGEEQ 5th Framework Project (2003–2005), an assistant professor in the Department of Political Sciences in Radboud University, from 2008 an associate professor of political science and women's studies (1990–2007), as well as a scientific director in IWM Vienna, QUING 6th Framework Project (2006–2011).

Since 2008, Verloo is a professor of comparative politics and inequality issues in the Department of Political Sciences, the Institute for Management Research and Member Institute for Gender Studies of Radboud University. She is also a permanent non-residential fellow in the Institute for Human Sciences of IWM Vienna (2004-). co-ordination hotspot on gender and power in politics and management at the Institute for Management Research at Radboud University (2013-).

== Fellowships and awards ==
Professor Verloo is a visiting lecturer of women's studies at University of Hamburg-Harburg (1995). A visiting fellow at the Institute for Human Sciences of IWM Vienna, throughout the first semester (2001). She was awarded 'Researcher of the Year' by the Institute for Management Research of Radboud University (2007), and also enjoyed the title of Guest Professor EDGE, Equality, Diversity and Gender Center at Aalborg University (23-30 November 2011).
