= Yogendra Gupta =

American physicist

- Born: India

Academic background
- Education: B.Sc., 1966, M.Sc., 1968, Physics, Birla Institute of Technology and Science, Pilani; PhD, Physics, 1972, Washington State University
- Thesis: Stress relaxation in shock loaded lithium fluoride single crystals. (1973)

Academic work
- Institutions: Washington State University

Yogendra M. Gupta is an Indian-American physicist. He is a Regents Professor in the Department of Physics and Astronomy at Washington State University (WSU).

== Education ==
Gupta attended the Birla Institute of Technology and Science, Pilani in India before emigrating to the United States to attend Washington State University (WSU) in 1968. His teacher at WSU was George E. Duvall, an early researcher of shock physics. After completing his PhD, Gupta conducted two years of postdoctoral research before joining the Stanford Research Institute as a Physicist, Senior Physicist, and assistant director in the Poulter Laboratory.

== Career ==
In 1981, Gupta joined the faculty of Physics and Astronomy at Washington State University and was shortly promoted to Full Professor. He was also appointed the Westinghouse Distinguished Professor in Materials Science and Engineering and served as Chairman of the APS Topical Group on Shock Compression of Condensed Matter. Afterward, Gupta became the founding director of the WSU Institute for Shock Physics which was established in 1997 with a $10 million grant from the U.S. Department of Energy. As a result of his academic achievements, he earned the 2001 Shock Compression Science Award from the American Physical Society for "his contributions to understanding condensed matter and nonlinear physics through shock-wave compression."

In 2005, Gupta was promoted to a Regents Professor in the Department of Physics and Astronomy for his "sustained accomplishment in teaching, scholarship and public service." He also received the 2005 Eminent Faculty Award for his contributions to shock-wave compressions and was named to a National Research Council committee on body-armor testing. In 2007, Gupta co-published Stiff Response of Aluminum under Ultrafast Shockless Compression to 110 GPA with Raymond F. Smith, Jon H. Eggert, Alan Jankowski, Peter M. Celliers, M. John Edwards, James R. Asay, and Gilbert W. Collins. The following year, Gupta and researchers at WSU's's Applied Sciences Laboratory received an $8.5 million research contract to "develop and demonstrate reactive materials to be used in a new generation of national security applications". In 2013, Gupta received the Distinguished Faculty Award from WSUs College of Arts and Science.

In 2015, Gupta was recruited by the United States Army to construct lighter yet still protective body armor for its soldiers. He also received his second WSU Eminent Faculty Award. The following year, he led a team of researchers in watching a material change its crystal structure in real-time, leading to a new concept of discerning the makeups of various materials.
