= Philip Abelson =

American physicist and scientific editor (1913–2004)

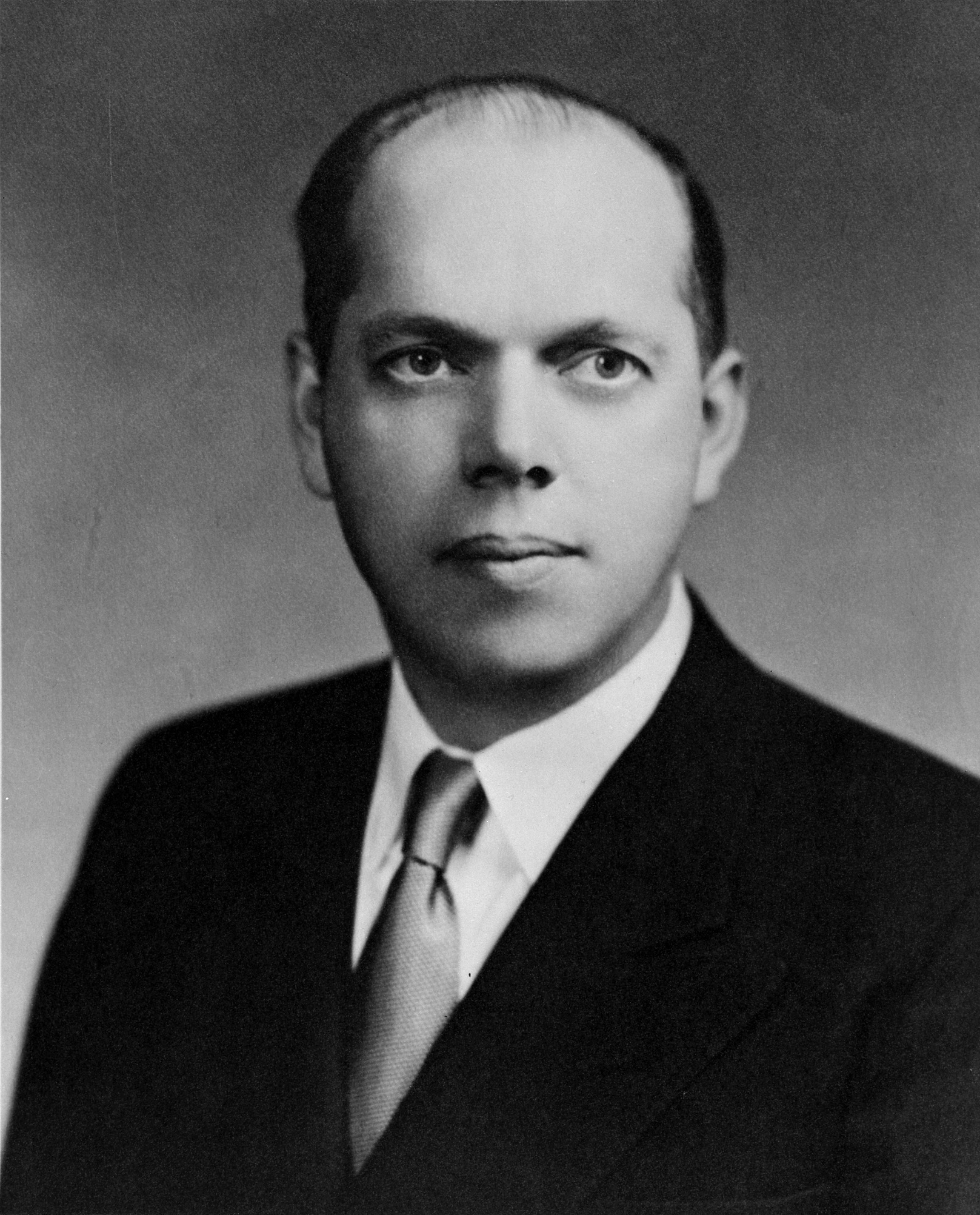
- Philip Abelson
- Born: April 27, 1913; Tacoma, Washington, United States
- Died: August 1, 2004 (aged 91); Bethesda, Maryland, United States
- Education: Washington State University; University of California, Berkeley
- Known for: Discovery of neptunium, isotope separation techniques
- Awards: Kalinga Prize (1972); National Medal of Science (1987); Public Welfare Medal (1992); Vannevar Bush Award (1996)
- Scientific career
- Fields: Nuclear physics

Philip Hauge Abelson (April 27, 1913 – August 1, 2004) was an American physicist, scientific editor and science writer. Trained as a nuclear physicist, he co-discovered the element neptunium, worked on isotope separation in the Manhattan Project, and wrote the first study of nuclear marine propulsion for submarines. He later worked on a broad range of scientific topics and related public policy, including organic geochemistry, paleobiology and energy policy.

Abelson served as editor-in-chief of the journal Science from 1962 to 1984, president of the Carnegie Institution of Washington from 1971 to 1978, and president of the American Geophysical Union from 1972 to 1974. His frequent editorials in Science, both during and after his term as editor, became known for their strident and thought-provoking views. A collection of 100 of his editorials was published as a book, entitled Enough of Pessimism. He may have been the original source of the phrase 'extraordinary claims require extraordinary evidence'.

== Early life and education ==
Abelson was born on April 27, 1913, in Tacoma, Washington, to Norwegian immigrant parents. He attended Washington State University, where he received degrees in chemistry and physics, and the University of California, Berkeley (UC Berkeley), where he earned his PhD in nuclear physics.

As a student physicist, he worked for Ernest Lawrence at the UC Berkeley. He was among the first American scientists to verify nuclear fission in an article submitted to Physical Review in February 1939. From 1939 until 1941, he worked as an assistant physicist at the Carnegie Institution in Washington, D.C. It was while he was here that he worked on a substance that emitted beta rays and was produced by irradiation of uranium with neutrons. After he collaborated with the Nobel Prize laureate Luis Alvarez they isolated the material, and became the co-discoverer of neptunium on 8 June 1940 with Edwin McMillan. McMillan was awarded the Nobel Prize for this discovery among other elements.

== Career ==
Abelson was a key contributor to the Manhattan Project during World War II, while working with the Naval Research Laboratory. Although he was not formally associated with the atom bomb project, the liquid thermal diffusion isotope separation technique that he invented at the Philadelphia Navy Yard was used in the S-50 plant in Oak Ridge, Tennessee, and proved a critical step in creating the large amount of nuclear fuel required for building atomic bombs.

After the war, he turned his attention under the guidance of Ross Gunn to applying nuclear power to naval propulsion. While not written at an engineering-design level, he wrote the first physics report detailing how a nuclear reactor could be installed in a submarine, providing both propulsion and electrical power. His report anticipated the nuclear submarine's role as a missile platform. This concept was later supported by Admiral Hyman G. Rickover and others. Under Rickover, the concept became reality in the form of USS Nautilus, the world's first nuclear submarine.

In 1946, he returned to work at the Carnegie Institution, which published his report "Atomic Energy Submarine," in March of that year. From 1953 until 1971 he served as the director of the Carnegie Institution of Washington's Geophysical Laboratory, and as president from 1971 to 1978, and as a trustee from 1978 on. From 1962 to 1984 he was editor of Science, one of the most prestigious academic journals, and served as its acting executive officer in 1974, 1975 and 1984. From 1972 until 1974 he served as the president of the American Geophysical Union.

Abelson was outspoken and well known for his opinions on science. In a 1964 editorial published in Science magazine, Abelson identified overspecialization in science as a form of bigotry. He outlined his view that the pressure towards specialization beginning in undergraduate study and intensifying in PhD programs leads students to believe that their area of specialization is the most important, even to the extreme view that other intellectual pursuits are worthless. He reasoned that such overspecialization led to obsolescence of one's work, often through a focus on trivial aspects of a field, and that avoidance of such bigotry was essential to guiding the direction of one's work.

In a 1965 article he described his work in paleobiology and reported evidence of amino acids recovered from fossils hundreds of millions of years in age and fatty acids in rocks dating over a billion years old. He estimated that based on his experiments alanine would be stable for billions of years.

Abelson may have been the original source of the phrase 'extraordinary claims require extraordinary evidence', which he used in 1978 and was subsequently popularised by Carl Sagan.

Perhaps his most famous work from this time period is an editorial entitled "Enough of Pessimism" ("enough of pessimism, it only leads to paralysis and decay"). This became the title of a 100 essay collection.

During the 1970s he became interested in the problem of world energy supplies. Books on the topic include Energy for Tomorrow (1975), from a series of lectures at the University of Washington, and Energy II: Use Conservation and Supply. He pointed out the possibilities of mining the Athabascan tar sands, as well as oil shale in the Colorado Rockies. In addition, he urged conservation and a change of attitude towards public transit.

After 1984, he remained associated with the magazine. Some have claimed him to be an early skeptic of the case for global warming on the basis of a lead editorial in the magazine dated March 31, 1990, in which he wrote, "[I]f the global warming situation is analyzed applying the customary standards of scientific inquiry one must conclude that there has been more hype than solid fact." However, this contrasts what is said in a US National Research Council, Energy and Environment report on which his name appears along with Thomas F. Malone over a decade earlier in 1977:

What is important is not that there are differences [in the models] but that the span of agreement embraces a fourfold to eightfold increase in atmospheric carbon dioxide in the latter part of the twenty-second century. Our best understanding of the relation between an increase in carbon dioxide in the atmosphere and change in global temperature suggests a corresponding increase in average world temperature of more than 6°C, with polar temperature increases of as much as three times this figure. This would exceed by far the temperature fluctuations of the past several thousand years and would very likely, along the way, have a highly significant impact on global precipitation.

— Philip H. Abelson, Thomas F. Malone, Cochairmen, Geophysics Study Committee

== Personal life and death ==
Abelson was married to Neva Abelson, a distinguished research physician who co-discovered Rh factor testing (with L. K. Diamond). Their daughter, Ellen Abelson Cherniavsky, worked as an aviation researcher for the MITRE corporation in Virginia.

Abelson died on August 1, 2004, in Bethesda, Maryland, from respiratory complications following a brief illness.

== Awards and legacy ==
Abelson received many distinguished awards, including the National Medal of Science in 1987, the National Science Foundation's Distinguished Achievement Award, the American Medical Association's Scientific Achievement Award, the Navy Distinguished Civilian Service Award and the Waldo E. Smith Award in 1988. In 1992 he was awarded the Public Welfare Medal, the National Academy of Sciences's highest honor. He was elected a fellow of the American Physical Society in 1949 and the American Academy of Arts and Sciences in 1958. He was elected to the American Philosophical Society in 1961.

The mineral abelsonite is named after Abelson in recognition of his contribution to organic geochemistry.

The Philip and Neva Abelson Hall at Washington State University was named in his honor.

The AAAS Philip Hauge Abelson Prize is named after Philip Abelson.

== Selected works ==
- "The International Society of Regulatory Toxicology and Pharmacology International Achievement Award". Regulatory Toxicology and Pharmacology. 21 (2): 325. 1995. doi:10.1006/rtph.1995.1046. PMID 7644722.
- Abelson, PH (1994). "Need for Enhanced Nuclear Safeguards". Science. 263 (5153): 1543. Bibcode:1994Sci...263.1543A. doi:10.1126/science.263.5153.1543. PMID 17744766.
- Abelson, PH (1988). "Storage of Spent Nuclear Fuels in Nevada". Science. 239 (4838): 333. Bibcode:1988Sci...239..333A. doi:10.1126/science.239.4838.333. PMID 17836854.
- Abelson, PH (1982). "Efforts to Decrease Nuclear Tensions". Science. 218 (4571): 427. Bibcode:1982Sci...218..427A. doi:10.1126/science.218.4571.427. PMID 17808527.
- Abelson, PH (1976). "Glamorous Nuclear Fusion". Science. 193 (4250): 279. Bibcode:1976Sci...193..279A. doi:10.1126/science.193.4250.279. PMID 17745713.
- Abelson, PH (1976). "A Global Rush Toward Nuclear Energy". Science. 191 (4230): 901. Bibcode:1976Sci...191..901A. doi:10.1126/science.191.4230.901. PMID 17792689.
- Abelson, PH (1968). "Nuclear Power--Rosy Optimism and Harsh Reality". Science. 161 (3837): 113. Bibcode:1968Sci...161..113A. doi:10.1126/science.161.3837.113. PMID 17770587.
- Abelson, PH (1966). "Factors Favoring Nuclear Power". Science. 152 (3723): 703. Bibcode:1966Sci...152..703A. doi:10.1126/science.152.3723.703. PMID 17797430.
- Abelson, PH (1964). "Conventional versus Nuclear Power". Science. 146 (3645): 719. Bibcode:1964Sci...146..721A. doi:10.1126/science.146.3645.719. PMID 17729992.

== See also ==
- Nuclear marine propulsion
- Submarine-launched ballistic missile

== Sources ==
- Kennedy, D (2004). "In memoriam. Philip Hauge Abelson, 1913–2004". Science. 305 (5685): 765. doi:10.1126/science.305.5685.765. PMID 15297640. S2CID 178700248.
