= John C. Early =

American teacher and colonial officer

John Chrysostom Early (November 11, 1873 – January 2, 1932) was an American teacher and colonial officer. He was Governor of Mountain Province in Cordillera, Philippines and an advisor to Governor General of the Philippines, Dwight F. Davis.

== Career ==
His parents were John Early Sr. and Anastasia Kinsella, Irish immigrants to the United States. John C. Early was born in Edina, Missouri on November 11, 1873. In 1878, the family moved to Moorhead, Minnesota. Early studied at Fargo College and the Moorhead Normal School (later renamed Minnesota State University Moorhead).

In his early career, Early ran the family farm and brick business in Minnesota. He lived in Seattle and mined for gold in Klondike. He enrolled Washington Agricultural College (later renamed Washington State University) where he studied under sociology professor Walter Greenwood Beach. After attaining his bachelor's degree, Early worked as a teacher, farmer and newspaper publisher. He published The Southern Idaho Review.

He moved to the Philippines in 1906, during the American period, to work as a teacher. He was Governor of Mountain Province from 1923 to 1930.

He died on January 2, 1932, in Baguio.
