= Neva Abelson =

American research physician

- Born: November 19, 1910; Lamar, Missouri, US
- Died: September 26, 2000 (aged 89); Washington, US
- Education: Washington State University; Johns Hopkins University
- Occupations: Pediatrician; research physician
- Known for: Rh blood factor test
- Spouse: Philip Abelson
- Scientific career
- Fields: Clinical pathology
- Institutions: University of Pennsylvania

Neva Irene Martin Abelson (November 19, 1910 – September 26, 2000) was a distinguished research physician who co-discovered the life-saving blood test for the Rh blood factor (with Louis K. Diamond).

The Philip and Neva Abelson Hall at Washington State University was named in her honor.

== Early career ==
Abelson graduated from Washington State University with a B.S. degree in chemistry. She became one of the first women to graduate from Johns Hopkins University with a medical degree. After medical school she became a pediatrician. She was the first pediatrician to ever be placed in charge of Johns Hopkins nurseries.

Her research at the University of Pennsylvania, where she was a professor of clinical pathology, involved blood groups, blood diseases of infants, and the pathogenesis of rheumatoid arthritis. She published a book, Topics in Blood Banking, in 1974. She received the Emily Cooley Memorial Award from the American Association of Blood Banks.

In 1989, she received the Regents’ Distinguished Alumnus Award for her contributions to developing the test for the Rh blood factor.

She and her husband are responsible for contributing the largest fellowship endowment in Washington State University's College of Sciences.

== Personal life ==
Abelson married Philip Abelson (1913–2004), a physicist, science writer and longtime editor of Science magazine. Their daughter, Ellen Abelson Cherniavsky who is now retired, worked as an aviation researcher at The MITRE Corporation in Virginia.
