= Jeffery Dagle =

American electrical engineer

- Education: Washington State University
- Occupation: Electrical engineer

Jeffery Dagle is an American electrical engineer. He named a fellow of the Institute of Electrical and Electronics Engineers, "for leadership in guiding the collaborative deployment of wide-area time-synchronized measurements for grid reliability".
