= Frances Penrose Owen =

Frances Shipman Penrose Owen (February 16, 1900 – March 9, 2002) was a community volunteer in Seattle, Washington, a 22-year member of the Seattle School Board and the first woman on the Board of Regents of Washington State University, the state's land-grant research institution, serving from 1957 to 1975.

== Early life and education ==
Penrose was born in Walla Walla, Washington. She was the second of six children of Stephen Beasley Linnard Penrose, long-time president of Whitman College, and his wife Mary Deming Shipman Penrose. She graduated magna cum laude with a bachelor's degree in Greek from Whitman College in 1919. In 1920, she became a charter member of Whitman's Phi Beta Kappa chapter. Penrose continued her education with graduate studies at Bryn Mawr College and earned a master's degree in education from Harvard University in 1922.

Penrose also earned a certificate in merchandising and personnel work from the Prince School in Boston, affiliated with Simmons College and Harvard University. In 1925, she took a position as a personnel training officer with the Frederick & Nelson Department Store in Seattle. She also was a training director for a Minneapolis department store before marriage.

== Public service ==
Following her marriage in 1934, Owen joined the Board of Trustees of Children's Orthopedic Hospital, which later became the Seattle Children's Hospital. She was on the hospital board for 36 years. In 1945, Owen was elected to the Seattle School Board, serving until 1967. She was the second woman on the school board. During her 22-year tenure, she was board president four times. Then, in 1957, then Governor Albert Rosellini appointed Owen to the WSU Board of Regents, the first woman in that role. She served for 18 years and was twice elected board president. Her public service career was wide-ranging, including the Seattle Community Chest, board membership of the Ryther Child Center in Seattle and the National Child Welfare League.

== Recognition ==
In 1990, then Washington Governor Booth Gardner presented Owen the state's Medal of Merit for her service to education. In 1989, the Seattle School Board dedicated the Frances Penrose Owen Auditorium at Seattle School Board headquarters in her honor. In 1979, Washington State University honored her 18 years of service as a regent by naming a major new library on the Pullman campus the Frances Penrose Owen Science and Engineering Library. In 1966–1968, she received Citizen of the Year honors from two Seattle organizations, including the Seattle-King County Board of Realtors. In 1949, she received the honorary Doctor of Humane Letters from Whitman College, her undergraduate alma mater.

== Family ==
The Penrose family of Philadelphia is one of the most prominent Cornish American families to have settled in Pennsylvania. Frances was the daughter of Stephen Beasley Linnard Penrose, born December 20, 1864, in Philadelphia to Clement Biddle Penrose and his wife Mary Beasley Linnard. He went to Dayton, Washington, in the late nineteenth century as a Congregational missionary and pastor, then led Whitman College from 1894 to 1934. Stephen married, on June 17, 1896, Mary Deming Shipman of Hartford, Connecticut, the daughter of Nathaniel Shipman and his wife Mary Caroline Robinson.

On March 18, 1934, Frances married Henry Barlow Owen in Walla Walla. He was vice president for personnel at Frederick & Nelson. She was then known publicly for four decades as Mrs. Henry B. Owen. She and Henry had a daughter, Frances Penrose Owen, whose married name is Frances Owen Pease. In 1946, Henry became founding manager of KING Radio in Seattle, a station founded by his wife's good friend Dorothy Bullitt. He later was executive vice president of King Broadcasting Company. Frances began to use the name Frances Penrose Owen only after her husband died in August 1976. Frances died March 9, 2002, at the age of 102. The Seattle Times newspaper called her one of the most important women in the state of Washington.
