= Martin Pall =

American biochemist

Martin L. Pall is professor emeritus of biochemistry and basic medical sciences at Washington State University. He is a specialist in Chronic Fatigue Syndrome, "multiple chemical sensitivity", and the effects of low-intensity microwave frequency electromagnetic fields (MWV-EMF) on the human body. He believes that the expansion of 5G mobile phone networks and the use of wireless technology has negative consequences for human health.

== Early life ==
Pall has a BA in physics and earned his PhD in biochemistry and genetics from Caltech.

== Career ==
Pall was professor of biochemistry and basic medical sciences at Washington State University (WSU). During his tenure, he researched and published numerous articles on Chronic Fatigue Syndrome. In 2008, he retired from his teaching position to concentrate his time researching the effect multiple chemical sensitivity and low intensity microwave frequency electromagnetic fields (MWV-EMF) have on the human body.

He has been a critic of the expansion of 5G mobile phone networks and the use of wireless technology generally, believing the technology has negative consequences for human health. In 2019, Kenneth R. Foster of Scientific American described him as "the most visible scientist in the public arena on this issue", while The Guardian described his research interests as "practically an encyclopaedia of the medical counterculture".
