= Olusola Adesope =

Nigerian academic

- Born: Ibadan, Nigeria
- Spouse: Tolu

Academic background
- Education: M.Sc., 2005, PhD., 2010, Simon Fraser University
- Thesis: The cognitive effects of verbal redundancy and animated concept maps on learning. (2010)

Academic work
- Institutions: Washington State University

Olusola O. Adesope is the Boeing Distinguished Professor of STEM Education and Professor of Educational Psychology at Washington State University.

== Early life and education ==
Adesope was born and raised in Ibadan, Nigeria. He first left Nigeria for the United States and worked as an IT Coordinator at the University of Wisconsin-Madison. He then immigrated to Canada in 2003 with his wife Tolu and enrolled at Simon Fraser University (SFU). At SFU, he earned his Master's degree in educational technology and his doctorate degree in educational psychology. In 2011, he received the G.M. Dunlop Award for best doctoral thesis in educational psychology completed at a Canadian university.

== Career ==
In 2010, Adesope joined the faculty of Educational Psychology at Washington State University. He received the TICL Outstanding Early Career Researcher Award two years later from the American Educational Research Association. He also conducted a study with researchers at Simon Fraser University which found that one-on-one computer-based tutoring was more effective than traditional teacher-based instruction when used on larger class sizes.

In 2017, Adesope was appointed to a second term on the editorial board of the Review of Educational Research journal. He was also promoted to the Boeing Distinguished Professor of STEM Education. In this role, he collaborated with Kripa Sundar to research how “seductive details” could deter learning in the classroom.
