= Morgridge Institute for Research =

Biomedical research institute

The Morgridge Institute for Research is an American private, nonprofit biomedical research institute in Madison, Wisconsin, U.S., affiliated with the University of Wisconsin–Madison. The institute works to improve human health by conducting, enabling and translating interdisciplinary biomedical research. Research areas include regenerative biology, virology, metabolism, and computational biology.

The institute was made possible with a $50 million gift from Tashia and John Morgridge as well as support from the Wisconsin Alumni Research Foundation and the state of Wisconsin, which collectively funded the public-private partnership between the Morgridge Institute and the Wisconsin Institute for Discovery.

The interdisciplinary science at the Morgridge Institute is funded by the National Institutes of Health, U.S. Department of Energy, U.S. Department of Homeland Security and other public and private sources. Relationships with industry and private investors leverage this funding to speed the commercial development of research results.

The Morgridge Institute for Research co-occupies the $150 million Discovery Building with the Wisconsin Institute for Discovery. The Wisconsin Alumni Research Foundation operates the building, including the 48,000-square foot Town Center, which functions to encourage interaction among scientists and community members and hosts events and educational programs. The entire project received gold certification in 2011 under the Leadership in Energy and Environmental Design program and is expected to use 50 percent less energy and water than a typical laboratory.

== History ==
Conceived by the Morgridges in 2005 to provide greater flexibility to scientists working in interdisciplinary fields such as regenerative biology, the project attracted matching funds from the state of Wisconsin and the Wisconsin Alumni Research Foundation, the patent and licensing organization for UW–Madison.

The Morgridges' gift, announced in April 2006, represented the single largest private donation in university history. A former CEO and chairman of Cisco Systems, John Morgridge and wife Tashia, a retired special education teacher, met in high school in Wauwatosa and graduated from UW–Madison in 1955.

Previous philanthropic gifts by the Morgridges to UW–Madison included a 2004 gift of $31 million to renovate and modernize the Education Building, as well as gifts to the School of Business and the College of Engineering. Their vision for the Morgridge Institute for Research included development of educational programs that would allow the public to engage with scientific topics such as human embryonic stem cells.

The Morgridge Institute allows university faculty to hold dual appointments in both traditional academic settings and the private center.

== Scientific leadership areas ==
The foundational research activities at the Morgridge Institute were driven by the work of scientific leaders regenerative biology, virology, and medical engineering, including James Thomson and Paul Ahlquist. These challenge areas built on core research strengths at UW–Madison and were supported by the university's expertise in high throughput computing. The areas were chosen for their potential to advance basic science and their promise of delivering new technologies to improve human health.

The Morgridge Institute subsequently developed a focus area in metabolism research and broadened its medical engineering focus to biomedical imaging, including by administering an award from the Chan Zuckerberg Initiative that supports BioImaging North America.

In 2024, Morgridge formalized its research focus in scientific communication by hosting two Rita Allen Foundation Civic Science Fellows under the mentorship of Dietram Scheufele and Dominique Brossard.

== Community engagement ==
The Morgridge Institute is the longtime host of Summer Science Camp, week-long overnight camps for high-school students from across the state, with registration and some sponsorship facilitated through the Wisconsin Rural Schools Alliance and Upward Bound.

The institute also co-produces the annual Wisconsin Science Festival every fall.

== Construction ==
The Morgridge Institute for Research opened in December 2010 and is housed in the Discovery Building, a 300,000-square-foot (28,000 m^{2}) building that is the first research facility on the UW–Madison campus to achieve LEED gold certification for green building practices. The project surpassed its initial goals for recycling 80 percent of construction waste by processing 92 percent of the demolition and excess construction materials for reuse.

A terra cotta tile system covering the building's exterior uses the clay stone's natural airtight properties to resist heat and moisture. Behind the 5-foot (1.5 m) clay tiles, which are supported on aluminum framing, a mineral fiber insulating membrane made from 90 percent recycled material provides additional buffering from heat and cold.

Other environmentally friendly features of the Discovery Building include a geothermal well system, solar hot-water heating, gray water use for irrigation and the use of high efficiency lighting, water flow fixtures and HVAC systems throughout. The facility is designed by Ballinger and Uihlein Wilson Architects and was constructed by Findorff Mortenson
