= History of the Chicago White Sox =

The Chicago White Sox are a Major League Baseball team based on the South Side of Chicago. They are one of eight charter members of the American League, having played in Chicago since the inaugural 1901 season. They have won six American League pennants and three World Series titles, most recently in 2005.

== Establishment ==
The team began as the minor league Sioux City Cornhuskers and played in the Western League. The WL reorganized itself in November 1893, with Ban Johnson as president. The Cornhuskers won the Western League Pennant in their first season in 1894. Johnson, a Cincinnati-based reporter, had been recommended by his friend Charles Comiskey, former major league star with the St. Louis Browns in the 1880s, who was then managing the Cincinnati Reds. After the 1894 season, when Comiskey's contract with the Reds was up, he decided to take his chances at ownership. He bought the Sioux City team and transferred it to Saint Paul, Minnesota, renaming the team the St. Paul Saints, which enjoyed some success over the next five seasons.

In 1900, the Western League changed its name to the American League. It was still officially a minor league, subject to the governing National Agreement and an underling of the National League. The NL gave permission to the AL to put a team in Chicago, provided they not use the city name in the team's branding. Comiskey moved his St. Paul club to the Near South Side and renamed it the White Stockings, grabbing a nickname that had once been used by the Chicago Cubs. The White Stockings won the 1900 American League pennant led by player-manager Dick Padden, the final WL/AL championship season as a minor league. After the season, the AL declined to renew its membership in the National Agreement and declared itself a major league.

== 1901–1917: Early years ==
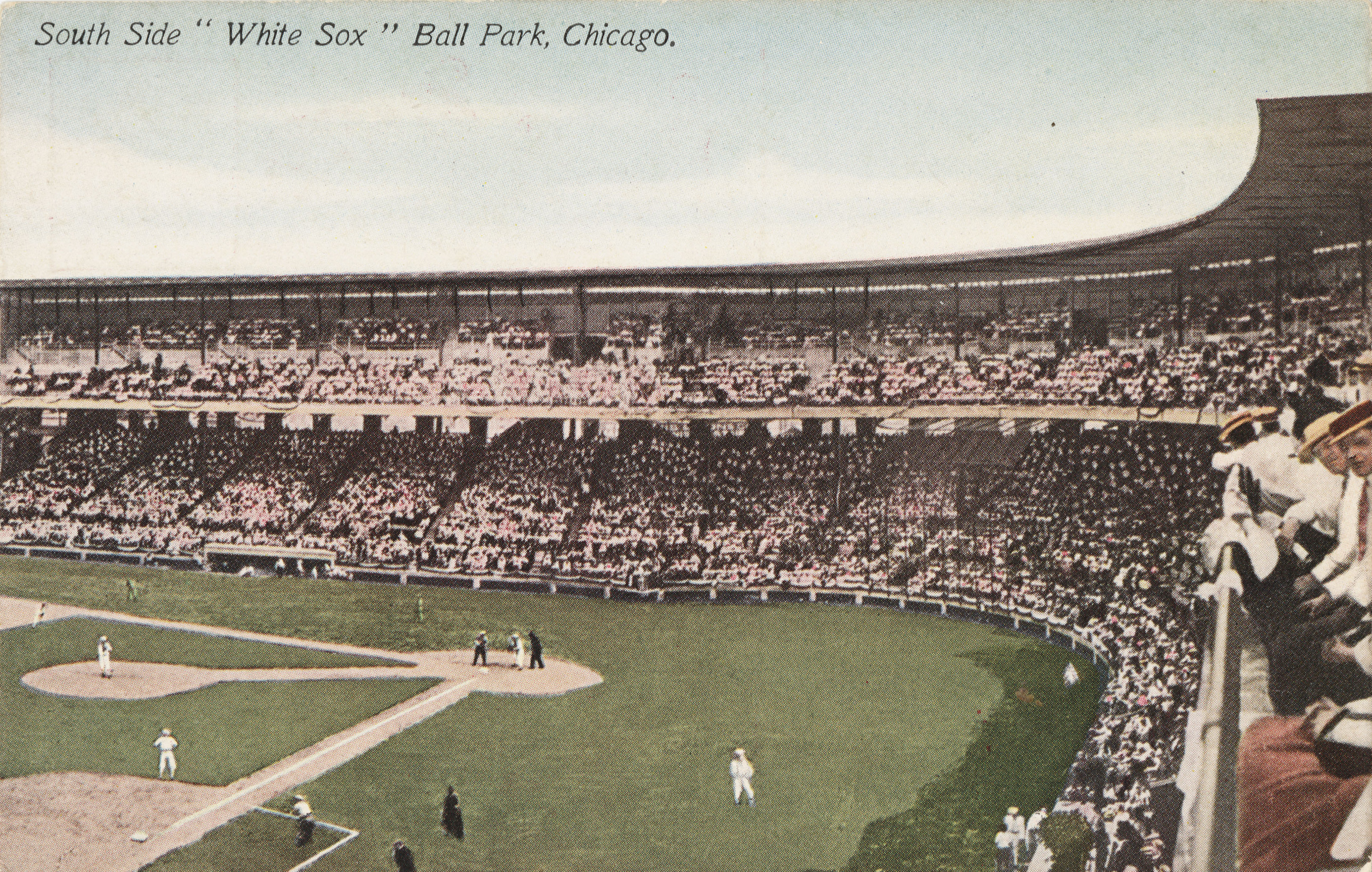
Comiskey Park, then known as "White Sox Park", in the early 1910s

After acquiring a number of stars from the older league, including pitcher and manager Clark Griffith, the White Stockings also captured the AL's first major-league pennant the next year, in 1901. Headline editors at the Chicago Tribune sports department immediately began shortening the name to "White Sox", and the team officially adopted the shorter name in 1904. The name change to the White Sox was brought on after scorekeeper Christoph Hynes wrote White Sox at the top of a scorecard rather than White Stockings, this scorecard was then seen by the press. The White Sox would continue to be built on pitching and defense in the following years, led by pitching workhorse Ed Walsh, who routinely pitched over 400 innings each season in his prime.

=== 1906: The Hitless Wonders ===
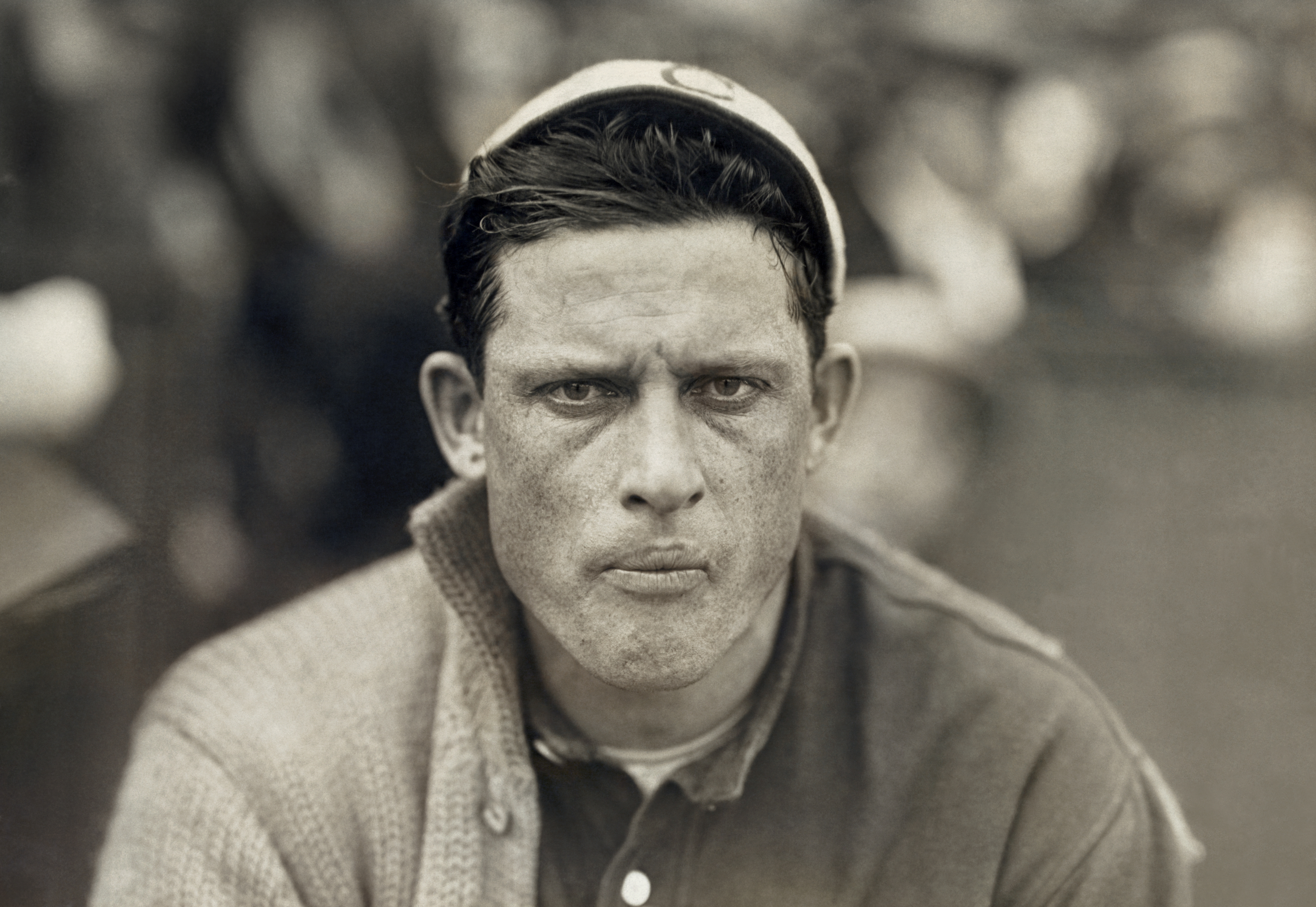
Ed Walsh was a dominant starter for the White Sox from 1904 to 1916 and holds the lowest career ERA in Major League history.

Walsh, Doc White and Nick Altrock paced the White Sox to their 1906 pennant and faced the crosstown rival Cubs in the 1906 World Series. The Cubs had won a then-record 116 regular-season games and were an overwhelming favorite to defeat the White Sox, especially since the White Sox had the lowest team batting average in the American League that year. However, in a stunning upset, the White Sox took the Series, and intracity bragging rights, in six games. To this day, the 1906 White Sox are known as "the Hitless Wonders".

The White Sox spent the next decade alternating between solid and mediocre seasons. During this time, however, they acquired a solid core of players such as catcher Ray Schalk, shortstop / third baseman Buck Weaver, and pitchers Eddie Cicotte, Red Faber and Reb Russell.

April 18, 1907, was the coldest Opening Day ever, when the temperature was 38 °F (3.3 °C).

In 1915, Pants Rowland became the manager and the White Sox added outfielder Shoeless Joe Jackson, second baseman Eddie Collins and outfielder Happy Felsch to the line-up. The White Sox finished in third place with a record of 93–61. In 1916, the White Sox acquired pitcher Lefty Williams and finished 2nd at 89–65.

=== The 1917 world champions ===
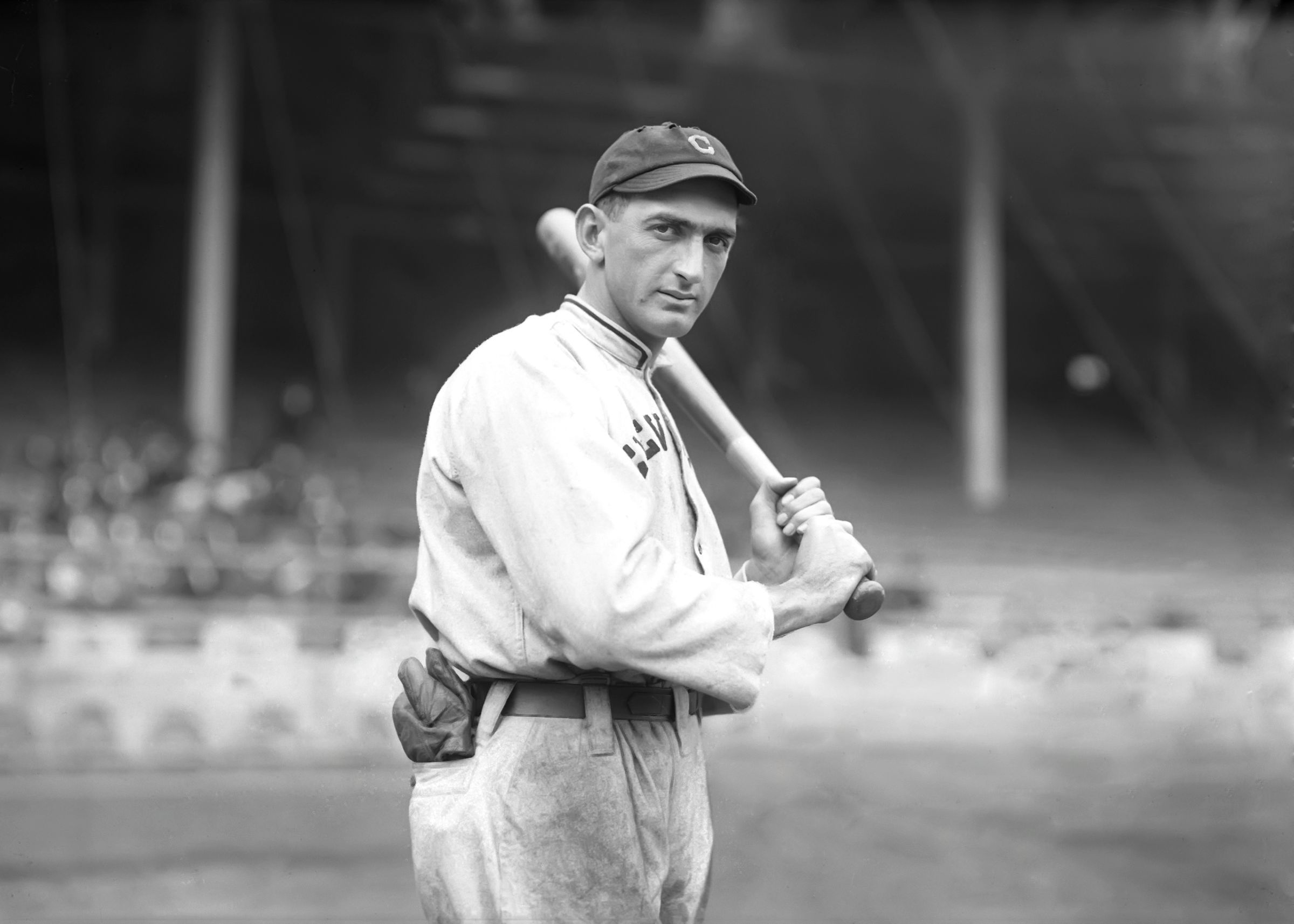
Shoeless Joe Jackson was a White Sox outfielder from 1915 to 1920, and still holds franchise records for both triples in a season and career batting average.

In 1917, the White Sox put the final pieces of the puzzle together with the addition of first baseman Chick Gandil and shortstop Swede Risberg. Weaver was moved over to third base.

The White Sox roared through the American League in 1917 with a record of 100–54 – still a franchise record for wins and winning percentage—and won the pennant by nine games over the Boston Red Sox. Their offense, led by Collins (.289, 91 runs), Felsch (.308, 102 RBI) and Jackson (.301, 91 runs), was 1st in runs scored. The White Sox pitching staff, led by Eddie Cicotte (28–12 1.53 ERA), Williams (17–8 2.97 ERA), Red Faber (16–13 1.92 ERA) and Reb Russell (15–5 1.95 ERA), ranked first with a 2.16 ERA.

==== 1917 World Series ====
The White Sox faced the 98–56 New York Giants in the 1917 World Series. The White Sox won Game one in Chicago 2–1 behind a complete game by Cicotte. Felsch hit a home run in the fourth inning that provided the winning margin. The White Sox beat the Giants in Game two by a score of 7–2 behind another complete game effort by Faber to take a 2–0 lead in the series.

Back in New York for Game three, Cicotte again threw a complete game, but the White Sox could not muster a single run against Giants starter Rube Benton and lost 2–0. In Game 4 the White Sox were shut out again 5–0 by Ferdie Schupp. Faber threw another complete game, but the Series was going back to Chicago even at 2–2.

Reb Russell started Game 5 in Chicago, but only faced 3 batters before giving way to Cicotte. Going into the bottom of the seventh inning, Chicago was down 5–2, but they rallied to score three in the 7th and three in the 8th to win 8–5. Red Faber pitched the final two innings for the win. In Game six, the White Sox took an early 3–0 lead and on the strength of another complete game victory from Faber (his third of the Series) won 4–2 and clinched the world championship. Eddie Collins was the hitting hero, batting .409 over the six-game series while Cicotte and Faber combined to pitch 50 out of a total 52 World Series innings to lead the staff.

== 1918–1920: The Black Sox ==
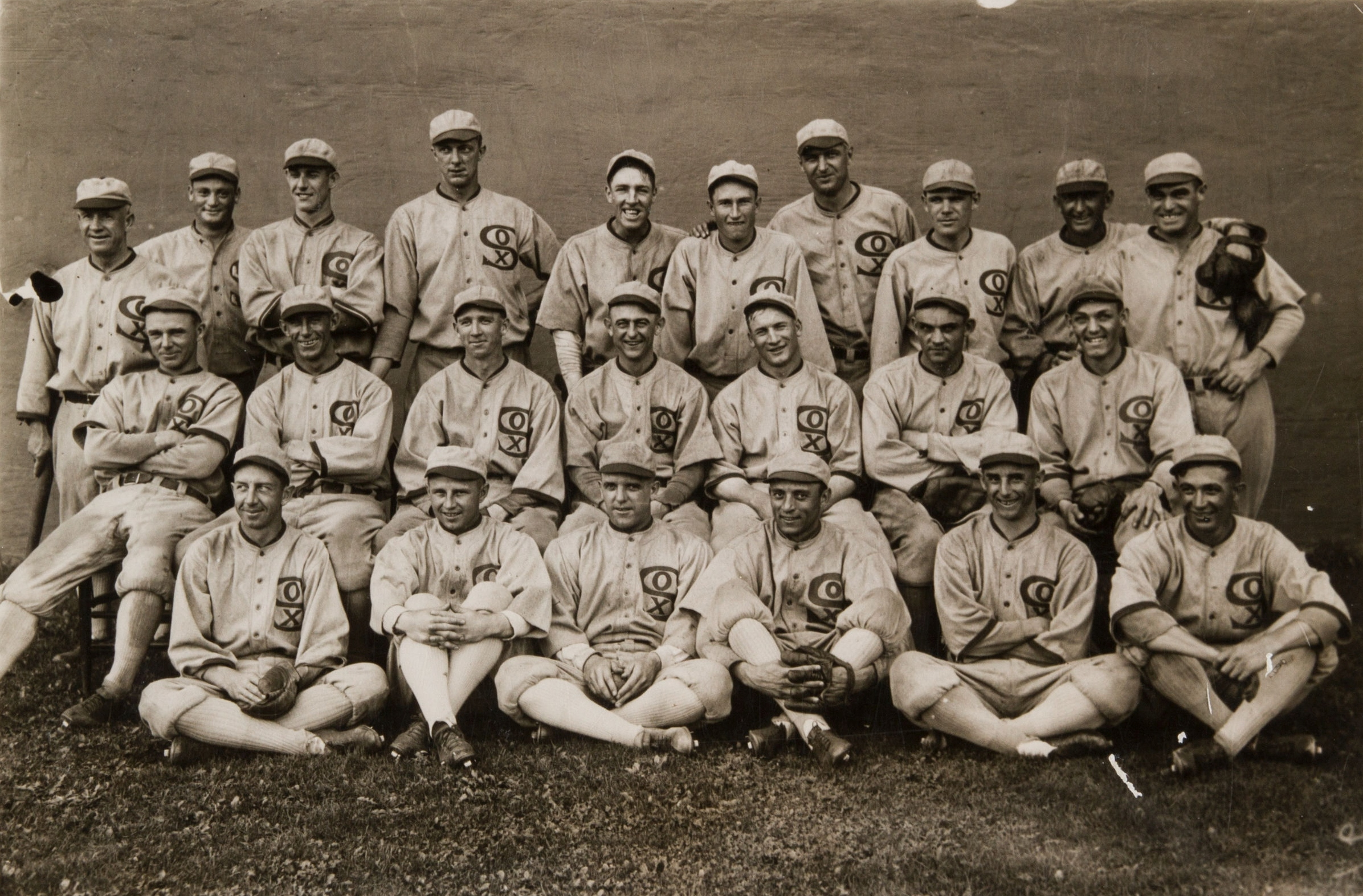
The 1919 Chicago White Sox

After an off-year in the war-shortened season of 1918, the club bounced back to win the pennant in 1919 and entered the World Series heavily favored to defeat the Cincinnati Reds in a best-of-9.

However, just before the World Series, it became known that some big money was being bet on the Reds, fueling talk that the World Series was fixed. The White Sox lost to the Reds in eight games.

=== 1920 ===
Rumors of a fix continued unabated through the 1920 campaign, even as the White Sox roared through the season and appeared well on their way to a third pennant in four years. The team's pitching was particularly strong that year; the 1920 White Sox pitching staff was the first in the majors to feature four 20-game winners.

=== Black Sox Scandal ===
In September 1920, an investigation into a fixed Cubs game eventually turned in the direction of the 1919 Series. During the investigation, Cicotte and Jackson confessed. Comiskey, who himself had turned a blind eye to the rumors, was compelled to suspend the remaining seven players (Gandil, eventually perceived as the ringleader, the one "connected" to the gamblers, had retired after the 1919 season) before their last season series against the St. Louis Browns. The suspensions ground the team to a halt; they lost two out of three games to the Browns and finished second, two games behind the Cleveland Indians. However, the evidence of their involvement (signed confessions) disappeared from the Cook County courthouse. Lacking that tangible evidence, a criminal trial (whose scope was limited to the question of defrauding the public) ended in acquittals of all the players. Regardless, newly installed Commissioner of Baseball Kenesaw Mountain Landis banned all the accused from baseball for life. He argued that even though the players had been acquitted, there was no dispute that they had broken the rules of baseball, and they could not ever be allowed to return if the game was to regain the trust of the public.

== 1922–1950: The lean years ==
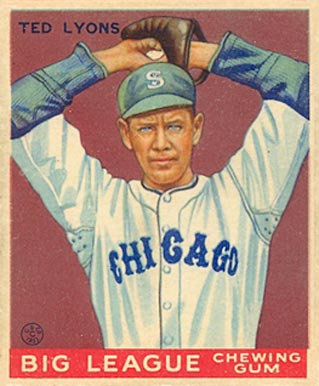
Ted Lyons' 1933 Goudey baseball card.

From 1901 to 1920, the White Sox won four out of a possible 19 pennants. However, they were severely crippled by the loss of seven of their best players in their prime. With a depleted roster, the White Sox dropped into seventh place in 1921 and would not contend again until 1936. During that stretch, only the 1925 and 1926 teams even managed to top .500. During this period, the White Sox featured stars such as third baseman Willie Kamm, shortstop Luke Appling, outfielder Leo Najo and pitcher Ted Lyons. However, an outstanding team was never developed around them, or a deep pitching staff. Ironically, the White Sox almost landed Babe Ruth; they offered to trade Jackson to the Red Sox for Ruth after owner Harry Frazee put his troublemaking star on the market. The White Sox offered Jackson and $60,000; however, the New York Yankees offered an all-cash deal of $100,000. Between the dumping of star players by the Philadelphia Athletics and the Red Sox, and the decimation of the White Sox, a "power vacuum" was created in the American League, into which the Yankees would soon move.

The White Sox finally became competitive again under popular manager Jimmy Dykes, who led them from 1934 to 1946 – still the longest managerial tenure in team history. However, the White Sox did not completely recover from their malaise until the team was rebuilt in the 1950s under managers Paul Richards, Marty Marion, and Al López.

== 1950–1967: The Go-Go era ==
Following Charles Comiskey's death in 1931, the team continued to be operated by his family – first by his son Lou, then by Louis' widow Grace, and finally by their daughter Dorothy Rigney. Not until 1959 did the team pass out of the family (thanks in part to a feud between Dorothy and her brother Chuck) to a new ownership group, led by Bill Veeck, who had run the Cleveland Indians and the St. Louis Browns.

During the 1950s, the team had begun to restore its respectability with manager Paul Richards utilizing an offensive philosophy emphasizing speed and a spectacular style of defense. Perennial All-Star Minnie Miñoso, a former Negro leaguer who became the White Sox' first black player in 1951, personified both aspects, leading the league in stolen bases while hitting over .300 and providing terrific play in left field. The additions of rookie shortstop Luis Aparicio in 1956 and manager Al López in 1957 continued the strengthening of the team, joining longtime team standouts such as Nellie Fox at second base, pitchers Billy Pierce and Virgil Trucks, and catcher Sherm Lollar. The White Sox would lead the American League in stolen bases every year from 1951 to 1961.

Although the White Sox had winning records every season from 1951 through 1967, the Yankees dynasty of the era often left the White Sox frustrated in second place; they were league runner-up five times between 1957 and 1965. Health problems forced Veeck to sell the team to brothers Arthur and John Allyn in 1961, and while the team continued to play well, many of the ballpark thrills seemed to be missing. The White Sox had several outstanding pitching staffs in the 1960s, with pitchers who had the best ERA in four different seasons -- Frank Baumann, 2.67 (1960), Gary Peters, 2.33 (1963), and again with 1.98 (1966) and finally Joe Horlen, 2.06 (1967).

=== 1959 ===
In 1959, the team won its first pennant in 40 years, thanks to the efforts of several eventual Hall of Famers – Lopez, Aparicio, Fox (the league MVP), and pitcher Early Wynn, who won the Cy Young Award at a time when only one award was presented for both leagues. The White Sox would also acquire slugger Ted Kluszewski, a local area native, from the Pittsburgh Pirates for the final pennant push. Kluszewski gave the team a much-needed slugger for the stretch run, and he hit nearly .300 for the White Sox in the final month. Lopez had also managed the Cleveland Indians to the World Series in 1954, making him the only manager to interrupt the New York Yankees pennant run between 1949 and 1964 inclusive.

==== 1959 World Series ====
After the pennant-clinching victory, Chicago Mayor Richard J. Daley, a lifelong White Sox fan, ordered his fire chief to set off the city's air raid sirens. Many Chicagoans became fearful and confused since 1959 was the height of the Cold War; however, they relaxed somewhat upon realizing it was part of the White Sox' celebration. The White Sox won Game 1 of the World Series 11–0 on the strength of Kluszewski's two home runs, their last postseason home win until 2005. The Los Angeles Dodgers, however, won three of the next four games and captured their first World Series championship since moving to the west coast in 1958. 92,706 fans witnessed Game 5 of the World Series at the Los Angeles Memorial Coliseum, the most ever to attend a World Series game, or for that matter any non-exhibition major league baseball game. The White Sox won that game 1–0 over the Dodgers' 23-year-old pitcher Sandy Koufax, but the Dodgers clinched the series by beating the White Sox 9–3 two days later at Comiskey Park.

=== Veeck ownership ===
Due to Veeck's arrival in 1959, Comiskey Park instantly became a ballpark filled with a series of promotional stunts which helped draw record crowds, the most obvious being the exploding fireworks Veeck installed in the scoreboard to celebrate home runs and victories. And in 1960, they became the first team in the history of sports to wear last names on the back of their jerseys, a Veeck innovation. Unlike Charles Comiskey, Veeck was considered a player-friendly owner, and players enjoyed playing for him.

=== 1964 ===
The 1964 season was especially frustrating, as the team won 98 games, four more than 1959, including their last nine in a row – yet finished one game behind the pennant-winning Yankees, who had a late-season 11-game win streak that opened up just enough room to stave off the White Sox's final charge.

=== 1967 ===
The White Sox were also involved in one of the closest pennant races in history in 1967. After leading the American League for most of the season, on the final weekend, the White Sox, Red Sox, Minnesota Twins and Detroit Tigers all had a shot at the pennant. However, the Red Sox would assert themselves in the final weekend, beating the Twins to take the pennant by a single game. The White Sox finished in fourth place at 89–73, three games behind.

== 1968–1975: Threats of relocation ==
In 1968, Bud Selig, a former minority owner of the Milwaukee Braves who had been unable to stop the relocation of his team three years earlier, contracted with the Allyn brothers to host nine home games (one against each of the other American League clubs) at Milwaukee County Stadium as part of an attempt to attract an expansion franchise to Milwaukee, Wisconsin.

The experiment was staggeringly successful — those nine games drew 264,297 fans. In Chicago that season, the White Sox drew 539,478 fans to their remaining 58 home dates (72 games, 14 doubleheaders). In just a handful of games, the Milwaukee crowds accounted for nearly one-third of the total attendance at White Sox games.

In 1969, the league expanded from 10 teams to 12, and the White Sox schedule in Milwaukee was likewise expanded to include 11 home games (again, one against every opponent). Although those games were attended by slightly fewer fans (198,211 fans, for an average of 18,019) they represented a greater percentage of the total White Sox attendance than the previous year — over one-third of the fans who went to White Sox games did so at Milwaukee County Stadium. In the remaining 59 home dates in Chicago (70 games, 11 doubleheaders), the White Sox drew 391,335 for an average of 6,632 per date.

Selig was denied an expansion franchise at the 1968 owners' meetings, and turned his efforts toward purchasing and relocating an existing club. His search began close to home with the White Sox themselves. According to Selig, he had a handshake agreement with Arthur Allyn in early 1969 to purchase a majority stake in the White Sox and move them north to Milwaukee. The American League, however, blocked the sale, unwilling to cede what was then the nation's second largest city to the National League and the Cubs. Arthur Allyn instead sold his shares to his brother John, who agreed to stay in Chicago. Selig would go on to buy the Seattle Pilots and move them to Milwaukee instead. John Allyn renamed Comiskey Park "White Sox Park" and installed artificial turf ("Sox Sod") in the infield (the outfield remained natural grass).

The 1970 White Sox hit rock bottom for the franchise in the post-World War II era, going a Major League worst 56–106, nine games worse than two second-year clubs in the American League West, the Kansas City Royals and Milwaukee Brewers, and seven worse than another 1969 expansion team, the San Diego Padres.

The White Sox had a brief resurgence in 1972, with slugger Dick Allen winning the MVP award; but injuries, especially to popular third baseman Bill Melton, took their toll and the team finished 5 1/2 games behind Oakland, the eventual world champion.

Several lawsuits against Major League Baseball from Seattle over the move of the Pilots to Milwaukee almost resulted in the White Sox being moved to the Emerald City in 1975. An elaborate scheme for a franchise shuffle soon came to light. The White Sox were to be moved to Seattle, then the Oakland Athletics were to take the White Sox's place in Comiskey Park. Oakland owner Charlie Finley was from nearby La Porte, Indiana. His A's had not drawn well during their Championship years in Oakland, California, and he wanted to bring them to Chicago. However, the shuffle collapsed when owner John Allyn sold the team to the physically rehabilitated Bill Veeck. In 1977, the Seattle Mariners were created, thus restoring the major leagues' presence in the Pacific Northwest.

== 1976–1981: The return of Veeck and the South Side Hitmen ==
On December 10, 1975, Bill Veeck regained ownership of the team, and he vowed to make the White Sox an exciting team again. Besides his customary promotions, Veeck introduced retro uniforms and shorts. The shorts were only worn three times. The first time was during the initial game of a doubleheader against the Kansas City Royals at Comiskey Park on August 8, 1976, followed by appearances on August 21 and August 22. The 1976 team was one of the worst White Sox teams ever, winning only 64 games (.398), drawing fewer than 915,000 fans.

Veeck's strategy to make the team competitive quickly, dubbed "rent-a-player" by sports writers, involved acquiring star players entering the final year of their contracts. The theory was that the players would strive to put up huge numbers in hopes of getting a big contract at the end of the season, and carry the club with them. The first of these acquisitions was made prior to the 1977 season and the last prior to the 1978 season. While this approach had the virtue of not having been tried, it was unsustainable. The Sox had to give up several young prospects in exchange for veteran players who invariably signed with other clubs after their single season in Chicago.

During this period the Sox acquired several players who were once stars but were past their primes. One was Don Kessinger, a shortstop who had his best years with the crosstown Cubs. Kessinger served as a player-manager in 1979. Another was outfielder Ralph Garr, who had his best seasons with the Atlanta Braves. A once-notable pitcher was John "Blue Moon" Odom, a former Oakland Athletics star. On July 28, 1976, Odom combined with Francisco Barrios on a no-hitter against Oakland, which proved to be Odom's last major league victory. The Sox also brought in Clay Carroll, a right-handed relief pitcher who was a key member of the Cincinnati Reds championship teams in the mid-1970s.

Unlike most of his fellow owners, Veeck had no income apart from the White Sox. More or less out of necessity, Veeck looked for any edge he could find. The club held open tryouts during spring training in 1978. They looked at pretty much anyone who showed up. Each player's name was sewn on his uniform, ostensibly to prove that the tryouts were legitimate and not just a stunt. This approach was the subject of an article in Sports Illustrated. The spring training tryout became a White Sox tradition that continues to this day.

=== 1977 ===
The 1977 season was a memorable one for the South Siders, led by off-season acquisitions Oscar Gamble (.297 AVG, 31 HR, 83 RBI), Richie Zisk (.290 AVG, 30 HR, 101 RBI) and American League Comeback Player of the Year Eric Soderholm (.280 AVG, 25 HR, 67 RBI). The team, known by the press and fans as the "South Side Hitmen" hit a since-broken team record 192 home runs and were in first place in the American League West as late as August en route to a third-place finish (90–72). They also drew a team-record 1,657,135 fans to Comiskey (since broken as well). Manager Bob Lemon was named AL Manager of the Year by UPI for his efforts.

=== 1978 ===
After the 1977 season Gamble and Zisk signed with other teams — Gamble with the San Diego Padres and Zisk with the Texas Rangers. Veeck's attempt to replace them with Bobby Bonds and Ron Blomberg fizzled as the 1978 team lost 90 games. Bonds appeared in only 26 games for the Sox before being dealt to the Texas Rangers, and Blomberg's major league career ended with the season's final game.

Lemon was fired June 30 but landed on his feet less than a month later when he was hired by Yankees owner George Steinbrenner to replace his beleaguered manager, Billy Martin. Under Lemon's cool hand, the Yankees erased a 14-game deficit in the American League East and defeated the Red Sox in a one-game playoff for the division championship, dispatched the Royals for their third consecutive pennant, and downed the Dodgers to repeat as World Series champions.

=== 1979–1981 ===
Two tough years followed: 87 losses in 1979 (including the infamous July 12 forfeit on Disco Demolition Night) and 90 losses in 1980. A bright spot emerged in August 1979 when Veeck replaced player-manager Don Kessinger with 34-year old coach Tony LaRussa, who embarked on a Hall of Fame career which lasted over three decades.

Veeck began building a farm system that produced several noteworthy players including Harold Baines and Britt Burns. But Veeck could not compete in the free agent market or afford what he called "the high price of mediocrity". By 1980, the White Sox were looking for new ownership. Veeck favored Ohio real estate tycoon Edward J. DeBartolo, Sr., whose family owned the NFL's San Francisco 49ers and the NHL's Pittsburgh Penguins and had tried to buy several MLB teams and move them to New Orleans. DeBartolo pleaded to be allowed to buy the White Sox and he promised to keep the team in Chicago. Baseball commissioner Bowie Kuhn blocked the deal, because he thought DeBartolo would be bad for baseball.

== 1982–2004: The early Reinsdorf era ==
Instead, Veeck sold the team to an ownership group headed by accountant Jerry Reinsdorf and television producer Eddie Einhorn. The new owners moved quickly to show that they were committed to winning by signing All-Star catcher Carlton Fisk from the Red Sox as well as power-hitting outfielder Greg Luzinski from the defending champion Phillies during the 1980–81 offseason. They also retained the club's young, relatively unknown manager, Tony La Russa.

=== 1983: "Winning Ugly" ===
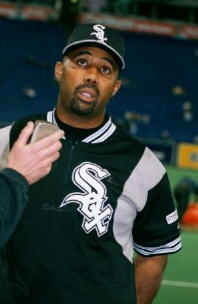
Harold Baines, one of the White Sox's franchise players throughout the 1980s, became one of the organization's all-time top hitting leaders during his 14 seasons in Chicago

In 1983, the White Sox enjoyed their best success in a generation. After a mediocre first half, the White Sox decided that they needed speed at the top of the lineup. The White Sox traded second baseman Tony Bernazard to the Mariners for Julio Cruz. With Cruz's speed, they went 60–25 to close out the season, clinching the AL West title, which earned Manager Tony La Russa his first Manager of the Year award.

Doug Rader, then-manager of the Texas Rangers, derisively accused the team of "winning ugly" for their style of play, which reflected a tendency to win games through scrappy play rather than strong hitting or pitching. Rader also thought that if the White Sox played in the Eastern Division, they would finish fifth behind powerhouses such as Baltimore, New York, and Milwaukee. Chicago media and White Sox fans picked up on the phrase, and turned "Winning Ugly" into the team slogan. While they had a great run in the regular season, they were not able to carry that over into the postseason as they lost to a powerful Baltimore Orioles team three games to one in the AL Championship Series. LaMarr Hoyt led the White Sox to a 2–1 victory in Game 1, but the Orioles clinched the series with a 3–0 ten-inning victory in Game 4. White Sox pitcher Burns pitched a "gutsy" game, throwing 9 1/3 shutout innings before a home run by Tito Landrum broke up the game and the hearts of the South Side faithful.

The 1984 season was remembered for two games at Comiskey, one bad (Jack Morris throwing a no-hitter for the Tigers in a nationally televised game) and one good (a 25-inning victory over the Brewers, a game which took eight hours, six minutes over two days and is still the longest in American League history by innings and time) for the White Sox.

=== 1985–1989 ===
The club slid back into mediocrity for the rest of the 1980s, contending only in 1985. Before the 1985 season began, the White Sox traded pitcher LaMarr Hoyt to the San Diego Padres in exchange for flashy shortstop Ozzie Guillén. Guillen would win the AL Rookie of the Year award. In 1986, broadcaster-turned-general manager Ken "Hawk" Harrelson fired La Russa after a poor start. The club would not contend again until 1990, the final year in Comiskey Park.

=== 1990s: "Good Guys Wear Black" ===
==== 1990 ====
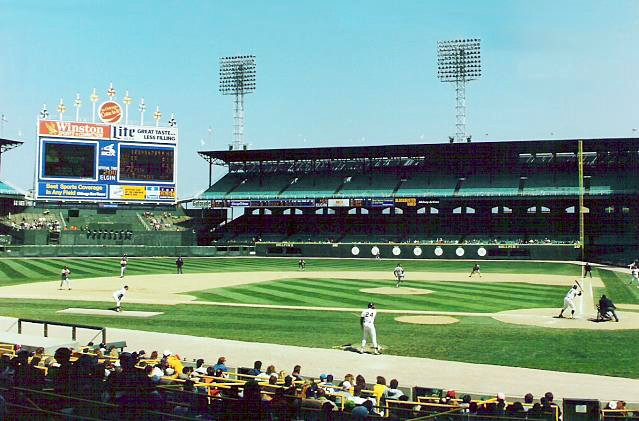
The Chicago White Sox hosting a home game at Comiskey Park in 1990

That season, closer Bobby Thigpen established a then record of 57 saves. In addition to that, first baseman Frank Thomas, pitchers Alex Fernandez and Jack McDowell, and third baseman Robin Ventura would make their presences felt on the South Side. The White Sox of 1990 won 94 games, but finished 9 games behind the powerful Oakland Athletics.

On July 11, as part of the celebration of Comiskey Park, the White Sox played a Turn Back the Clock game against the Milwaukee Brewers; the Brewers won 12–9 in 13 innings after posting a 6-run rally in the 8th inning to tie the game. The White Sox wore their 1917 home uniforms. This was the first Turn Back the Clock game in the major leagues and started what has become a popular promotion. New Comiskey Park opened in 1991, and was completed at a cost of $167 million.

==== 1993 ====
The team reached the ALCS in 1993. The White Sox were led by Thomas, Ventura, multi-sport star Bo Jackson, Cy Young Award winner McDowell and All-Star closer Roberto Hernández and won the last AL West before realignment with a 94–68 record. However, the White Sox were a big disappointment in the ALCS, losing to the defending World Champion Toronto Blue Jays in six games. The Blue Jays would go on to win the World Series again in 1993.

==== 1994 ====
The White Sox led the new American League Central at the time of the 1994 players' strike.

==== 1995–1999 ====
Although struggling in the 1995 season, the White Sox maintained some consistency through the rest of the 1990s, managing to finish in second place every year after, including 1997, the year of the notorious White Flag Trade. Although maligned by fans at the time, the move would ultimately help the team out later.

=== 2000–2004 ===
==== 2000: The Kids Can Play ====
Under Manager Jerry Manuel, the White Sox fielded a team viewed as talented but chronically under-achieving. In 2000, however, the White Sox had one of their most successful teams since the 1983 club. This team, whose slogan was "The Kids Can Play", won 95 games en route to an AL Central division title. The team scored runs at a very rapid pace, which compensated for an under-performing pitching staff led by Mike Sirotka and James Baldwin. Frank Thomas' offensive output nearly won him a third MVP award, assisted by strong offensive performances from Magglio Ordóñez, Paul Konerko, Carlos Lee and José Valentín.

As in 1983 and 1993, the 2000 team could not carry its success over into the postseason, getting swept by the wild-card Seattle Mariners in the Division Series. Despite new club records for hits (1,615), runs scored (978), RBI (926), home runs (216), and doubles (325), the White Sox hit only .185 in the ALDS and failed to score a run after the third inning in any of the three games.

==== 2003–04 ====
In 2003, Comiskey Park was renamed after cell phone company U.S. Cellular bought the naming rights at $68 million over 20 years, a very unpopular move among fans. In 2003, the All-Star Game was held for the first time at their new park. Although briefly leading the central in September (the first time since 1906 both Chicago teams were in first place at the same time), the White Sox ultimately finished four games behind the Twins.

In 2004, the team named Ozzie Guillen as the 37th manager in team history. Although again finishing in second place, losing streaks in August and September, along with various injuries, sunk the team. Several changes were made in the offseason, including trading Carlos Lee to the Brewers for Scott Podsednik. Although Magglio Ordóñez was nearly traded to the Red Sox for Nomar Garciaparra, the deal fell through and Ordóñez left as a free agent to sign with the Tigers.

== 2005: The drought ends ==
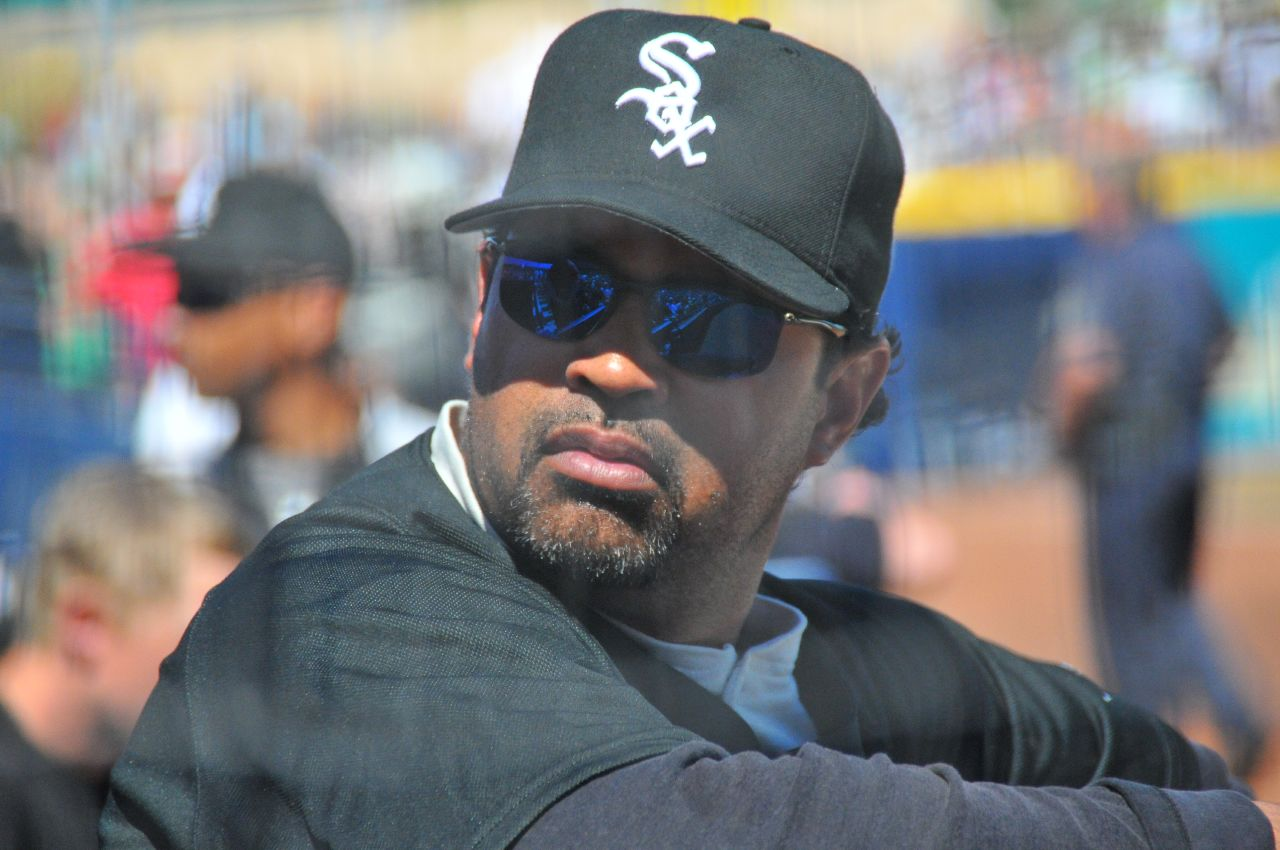
Ozzie Guillén not only made a name for himself as a solid defensive shortstop with the White Sox in the 1980s–1990s, but also as the team's manager from 2004 to 2011 where he led the franchise to a World Series title

The changes made an immediate impact on the team. In 2005, the White Sox posted the best record in the major leagues for much of the year, before a late season slump saw the St. Louis Cardinals overtake them (100 wins vs. 99 wins). Though a serious challenge for their dominance of the division was mounted late in the year by the Cleveland Indians (the Indians actually reduced what was once a 15-game lead for the White Sox down to 1 1/2 games at one point only to lose the last 7 games), Chicago scored a 4–2 victory over the Detroit Tigers on September 29 to win their first AL Central Division title since 2000. Finishing at 99–63 (.611) tied their 1983 record, and won the division by six games. The last time they had a higher percentage than that was 1920, when they finished second in the league thanks to the late-season "Black Sox" suspensions. The combination of the league's best record with the American League victory in the All-Star Game gave the White Sox the home field advantage throughout the 2005 postseason (perhaps unnecessary as the White Sox won every post-season road game they played in 2005).

=== 2005 ALDS ===
In the 2005 American League Division Series, the White Sox took on the Boston Red Sox, the 2005 AL wild-card winners and the defending World Series champions. The White Sox defeated the Red Sox in a three-game sweep. They won the first two games (scoring a 14–2 victory in the first game – their first postseason win at home since 1959 – and 5–4 in the second) of the series at home before claiming a 5–3 victory at Fenway Park in Boston. Scott Podsednik hit his first home run of the season in the first game of the series.

The ALDS also set the tone for what would be an unusually suspenseful post-season; while their first game was considered a blow-out, the remaining games saw the White Sox making the most of rare opportunities and hanging on to narrow leads. In the first inning of game 1, the White Sox put up 5 runs, and never looked back. A late inning three-run home run by Scott Podsednik – his first home run of the season, was the icing on the cake in the game 1 blowout. In Game 2, the White Sox were actually down 4–2 when Red Sox second baseman Tony Graffanino, formerly playing for the White Sox, let Juan Uribe's potential inning-ending, double-play grounder go through his legs; one out later, Tadahito Iguchi hit a three-run homer to left that clinched the game for the White Sox. In Game 3, Orlando Hernández entered the game with the bases loaded and nobody out with the White Sox ahead by only one run in the bottom of the sixth inning. Based on their regular season performance, it was later calculated that the Red Sox's probability of winning at that point was .662, even though they were trailing by one run. Instead, the first two batters, Jason Varitek and Tony Graffanino, both popped out, and Johnny Damon struck out swinging on a breaking ball. Hernandez went on to retire six of the next seven batters, and the White Sox's rookie reliever Bobby Jenks closed out the game.

=== 2005 ALCS ===
The White Sox then moved on to face the Los Angeles Angels of Anaheim in the ALCS. The Angels won Game 1, 3–2, the White Sox' only post-season loss.

In Game 2 on October 12, the teams were involved in one of the most controversial endings in baseball playoff history. With the score tied 1–1 with two outs in the bottom of the ninth, A. J. Pierzynski apparently struck out to end the inning. At first Pierzynski headed back to the dugout but ran to first base upon realizing that umpire Doug Eddings had ruled that Angels catcher Josh Paul (a former White Sox player) did not field the ball cleanly, meaning he would have to either tag the batter or throw to the first baseman to record the out (see uncaught third strike). Despite vehement protests from various members of the Angels, including manager Mike Scioscia, Pierzynski was awarded first base. Pinch-runner Pablo Ozuna replaced Pierzynski and stole second base. Third baseman Joe Crede then delivered a double on the third pitch to give the White Sox a 2–1 win. Overshadowed by that play was the 1-run, 5-hit complete game pitched by Mark Buehrle. Buehrle's excellent effort allowed the White Sox to capture their first-ever home victory in ALCS history.

Buoyed by their win, the White Sox traveled to Anaheim, California, where starters Jon Garland, Freddy García, and José Contreras (who had dropped Game 1 to the Angels in Chicago) pitched three more complete game victories consecutively over the Angels, giving the White Sox their first American League pennant since 1959. White Sox slugger Paul Konerko was named the ALCS MVP, on the strength of his two home runs, 7 RBI, and .286 average.

Especially in light of the evolution of the game, the White Sox four straight complete games was considered an unbelievable achievement. In fact, since José Contreras pitched 8 1/3 innings in game 1, the White Sox bullpen saw a total of 2/3 of an inning pitched (by Neal Cotts) in the entire series. The last time four consecutive complete games had been pitched in a championship series was in the 1956 World Series between the Brooklyn Dodgers and New York Yankees, and the 1928 Yankees were the last team to win four consecutive complete games in a championship series. In fact, the last time any major league pitching staff had hurled four straight complete game victories was near the end of the 1983 regular season, when the Texas Rangers accomplished the feat.

=== 2005 World Series ===
The White Sox now advanced to the World Series, where they would take on the National League champion Houston Astros. The White Sox' appearance in the World Series was bittersweet for longtime franchise star Frank Thomas. One of the most popular and productive players in the franchise's long history, Thomas would finally be going to a World Series in his 16th major league season. However, due to injury, Thomas would be unable to participate except as an observer, and his contributions to the White Sox in 2005 were limited.

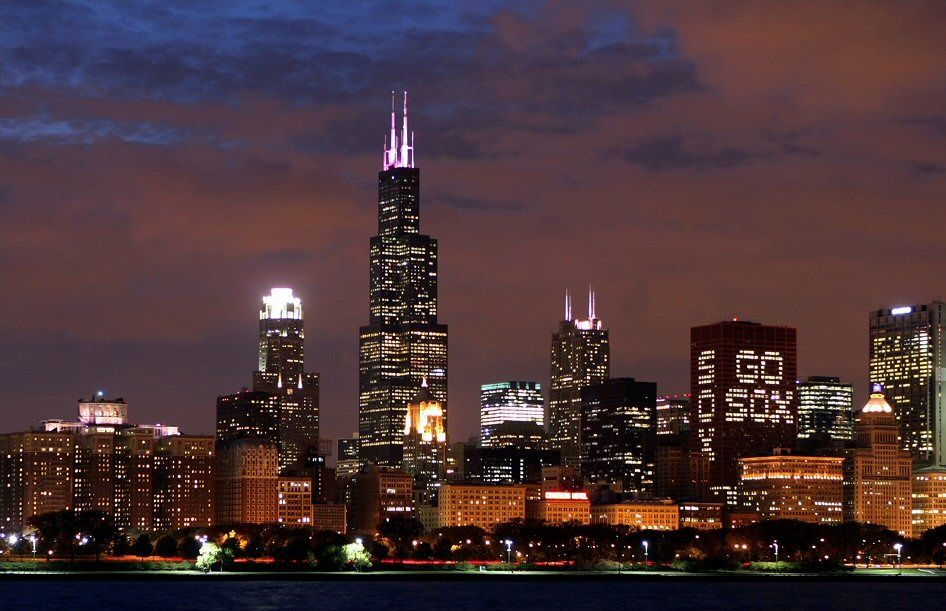
Chicago skyline during the World Series supporting the White Sox

Game 1 saw Astros' ace Roger Clemens leave the game with a hamstring injury, leaving José Contreras to finish up the Astros and Chicago took advantage of its opponents' weakness, winning 5–3. Joe Crede especially made an impressive showing with his stellar defensive plays at third base.

Game 2 of the Series, as in the ALCS, saw the White Sox again involved in a controversial play. With the White Sox down 4–2 in the seventh with two outs and two runners on base, the home plate umpire ruled that Jermaine Dye had been hit by a pitch, while the Astros argued (and TV replays confirmed) that the ball had actually hit the bat. Dye was given a free pass to first, and the next batter, Paul Konerko, launched a grand slam into left field to give Chicago a 6–4 lead. Houston tied the game on a two-run single with two outs in the top of the ninth, but in the bottom of the ninth, Scott Podsednik hit a walk-off solo home run off Brad Lidge to give the White Sox a thrilling 7–6 victory and a 2–0 lead in the Series. Podsednik was the first player in major league history to hit a home run in the World Series after not having hit any during the regular season. (He did, however, have a home run in Game 1 of the ALDS against Boston, making the World Series home run his second of the playoffs.)

The World Series then shifted to Houston for Game 3, in which Astros' starter and NLCS MVP Roy Oswalt cruised with a 4–0 lead until the wheels totally came off for him with a five-run fifth by the White Sox. The Astros managed to tie the game in the eighth, but repeatedly blew scoring opportunities in the next few innings. Finally, in the top of the 14th, former Astro Geoff Blum hit a tie-breaking home run; the White Sox took a commanding 3–0 Series lead with a 7–5 victory in the longest World Series game in history (in terms of time; tied for most innings). Ozzie Guillén sent Mark Buehrle in to get the last out in the bottom of the 14th to get the save after he had started Game 2, and later remarked that he was set to send Pablo Ozuna (a position player) in to pitch if the Astros somehow extended the game.

Game 4 was a pitcher's duel between Freddy García and Brandon Backe. The game was scoreless until Jermaine Dye singled to center off of Brad Lidge, driving in Willie Harris for what turned out to be the winning run. This was the second game of the series in which Lidge had given up the game-winning run (Podesednik's home run in Game 2). Game 4 also saw a spectacular defensive play by Juan Uribe, as the Chicago shortstop fell two rows into the stands in order to retire Chris Burke for the second out in the bottom of the ninth. Uribe also earned the assist in the final out of the Series on the next play, as he narrowly threw Orlando Palmeiro out at first to give the White Sox their first World Series crown since 1917.

Here's the 1-2 pitch to Palmeiro. A ground ball, past Jenks, up the middle of the infield, Uribe has it, he throws- OUT! OUT! A WHITE SOX WINNER! AND A WORLD CHAMPIONSHIP! The White Sox have won the World Series, and they're mobbing each other on the field!

— White Sox radio announcer John Rooney calling the final play on WMVP 1000

Dye was named the World Series MVP in the four-game sweep.

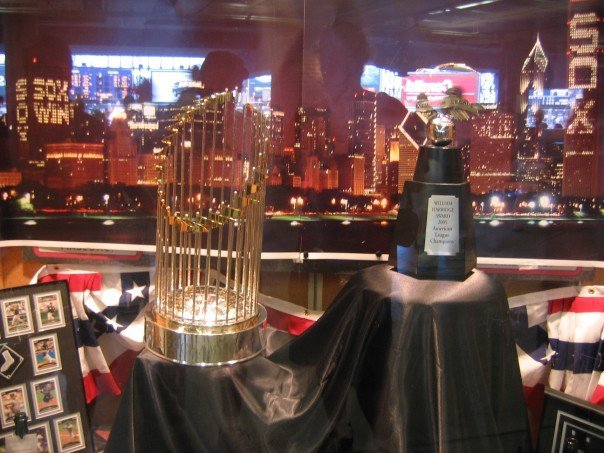
The White Sox' World Series Trophy on display at U.S. Cellular Field during the 2006 season

Only the 1927 Yankees and the 1984 Detroit Tigers were able to achieve such a feat. Their 11–1 postseason record was tied with 1999 Yankees as the best single post season mark. (Only Cincinnati Reds in 1976 had a better winning percentage by going 7–0.) Also, their 8-game winning streak (the four wins over the Angels and the sweep against the Astros) is tied with the Boston Red Sox (who won 8 games in a row en route to their 2004 World Series championship) and the Kansas City Royals (who won the 2014 Wild Card Game and swept the Los Angeles Angels and Baltimore Orioles in the ALDS/ALCS) for the longest postseason winning streak in Major League history. The White Sox also became the first team to win all three post-season victories on the road. Amazingly, despite their 105-year history, this was only the franchise's third World Series championship, (following victories in 1917 and 1906). It also marked their first pennant since the advent of divisional play in 1969 (the White Sox won the inaugural American League pennant in 1901, but this was 2 years prior to the first modern World Series).

== 2006–present: Post-World Series ==
=== 2006 season ===
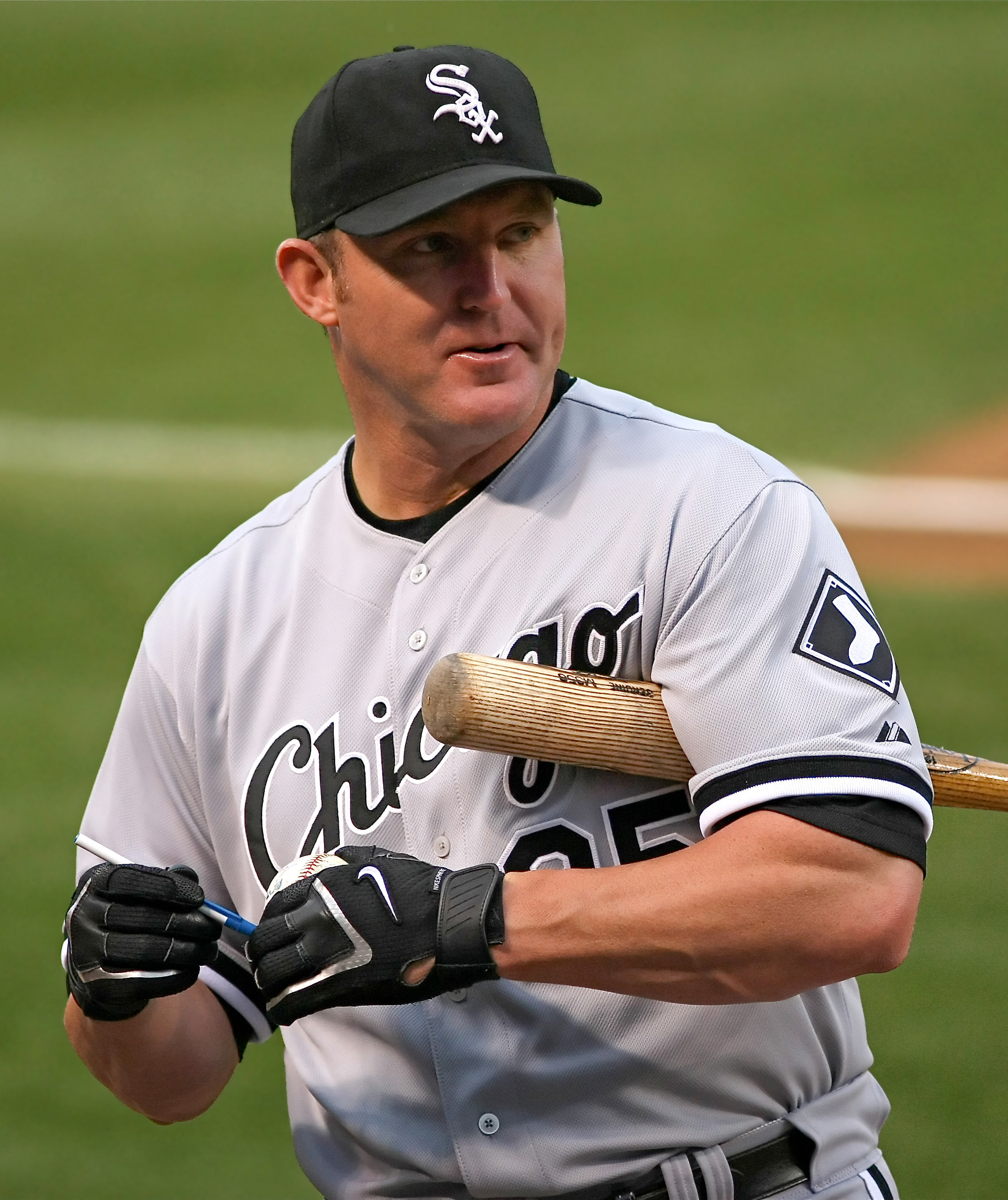
Jim Thome

After leading the wild card race for much of the season, the White Sox faltered, losing 15 of 24 at the beginning of September to eliminate them from playoff contention, ending their chances of becoming the first repeat winner of the World Series since the New York Yankees in 1999 and 2000. They nonetheless finished with a 90–72 record, the season's best record by a non-playoff team.

This was the first year a White Sox manager had led the AL All-Star squad since 1994, when Gene Lamont led the team. In addition to manager Ozzie Guillén, the White Sox had six representatives at the 77th All-Star Game at PNC Park in Pittsburgh, the most among any club: starting pitcher Mark Buehrle, closer Bobby Jenks, catcher A. J. Pierzynski, first basemen Paul Konerko and Jim Thome, and right fielder Jermaine Dye. José Contreras was originally selected to pitch in the All-Star Game, but was replaced by Francisco Liriano. Guillen removed Contreras from the roster after a 117-pitch performance in a 19-inning game against Boston on the last day before the All-Star Break.

Pierzynski was the last White Sox to be named to the team after winning the year's Final Vote, in which the fans select the 32nd and final player on both the AL and NL squads. Pierzynski is the second White Sox to be selected, following Scott Podsednik's nomination in 2005. Dye competed in the 2006 CENTURY 21 Home Run Derby; he managed to hit 7 home runs in the first round, but David Ortiz and Ryan Howard both surpassed that total to knock Dye out of the competition.

The White Sox drew 2,957,414 fans for an average of 36,511, third in the AL. There were a total of 52 sellouts, breaking the previous team record of 18. The White Sox also drew 75 crowds in excess of 30,000, another franchise record.

=== 2007 season ===
On April 18, Buehrle pitched a no-hitter against the Texas Rangers, 6–0. Buehrle's only blemish was a walk to Sammy Sosa in the fifth, but Buehrle would promptly pick Sosa off during the next at-bat. Buehrle secured his spot in the MLB record books when he forced Rangers catcher Gerald Laird to ground out to third baseman Joe Crede at 9:14 P.M. CDT, sending the crowd of 25,390 at U.S. Cellular Field into a frenzy. He would face the minimum of 27 batters using 106 pitches (66 strikes), with the one walk to Sosa and eight strikeouts. Jermaine Dye hit a grand slam and Jim Thome added two solo homers in the history-making night.

On July 6, the White Sox announced the signing of Mark Buehrle to a contract extension worth $56 million over four years. The move came after weeks of rumors of Buehrle possibly being traded.

Overall, the White Sox season was hampered by injuries and a team-wide hitting slump. However, the season was not a complete failure with Mark Buehrle's no hitter, Jim Thome's 500th home run, and closer Bobby Jenks 41 consecutive batters retired (tying Jim Barr's all-time record and breaking the American League record.) Jenks would later fall short of the all-time record when Kansas City Royal's player Joey Gathright slapped a ground ball into left field just out of the reaches of third baseman Josh Fields and shortstop Juan Uribe.

The White Sox finished the season fourth in their division with a 72–90 record, behind the Cleveland Indians, Detroit Tigers, and Minnesota Twins.

=== 2008 Season: Central champs again and a "blackout game" ===
On July 31, the day of the trade deadline, the White Sox traded relief pitcher Nick Masset and minor leaguer 2nd Baseman Danny Richar for Ken Griffey Jr. of the Cincinnati Reds.

On August 14, Jim Thome, Paul Konerko, Alexei Ramírez, and Juan Uribe combined to hit four consecutive home runs against the Kansas City Royals off of pitchers Joel Peralta and Rob Tejeda, something that has only been done six other times in the history of Major League Baseball.

On September 29, 2008, Ramirez hit his fourth grand slam of the season, setting a major-league single-season record for a rookie, off of Detroit Tigers pitcher Gary Glover in an 8–2 White Sox victory to qualify the White Sox for a one-game playoff against the Minnesota Twins for the AL Central title. This also broke the team record for most grand slams in a single season.

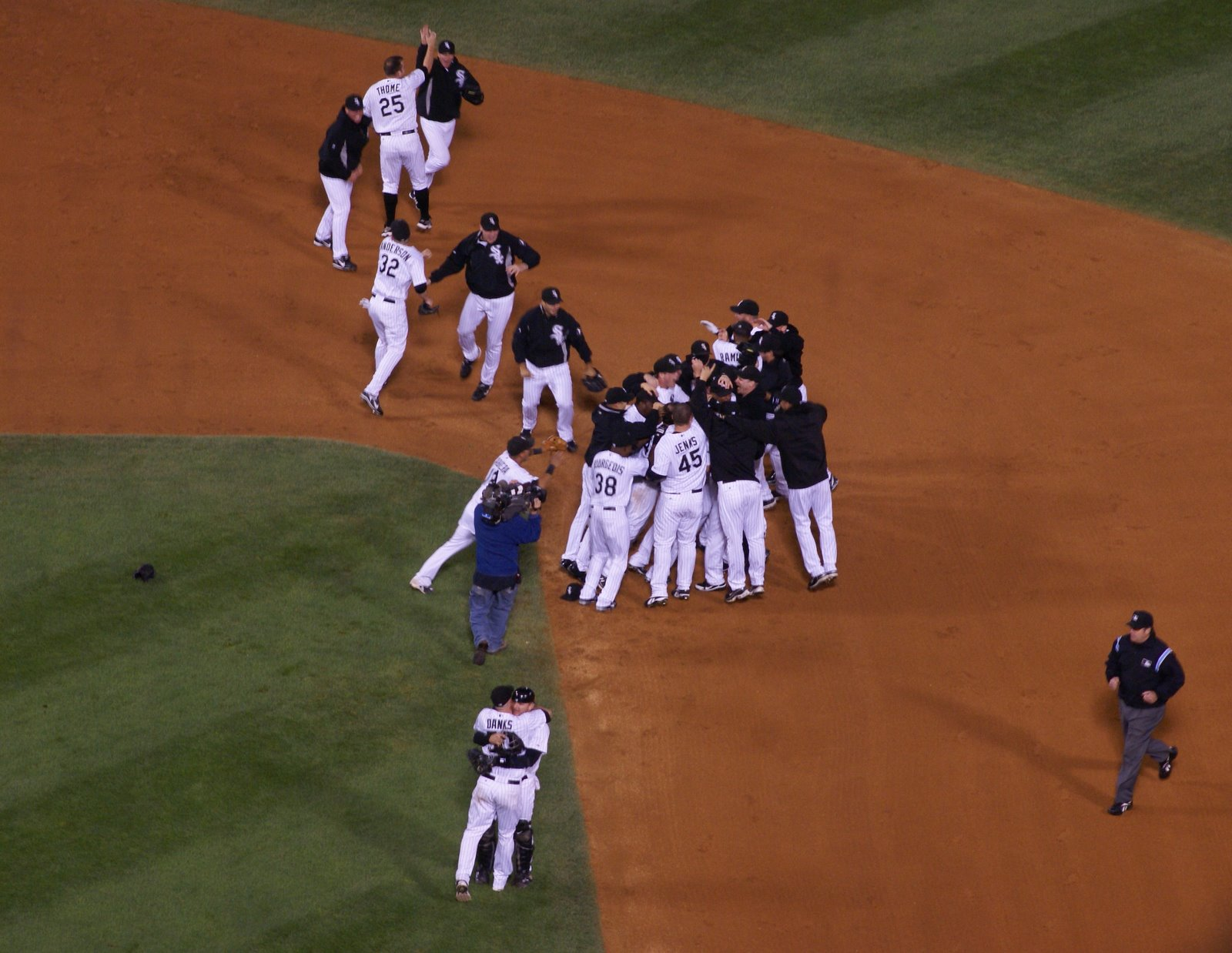
Chicago White Sox celebrate after winning a tiebreaker game against the Minnesota Twins on September 30, 2008.

On September 30, 2008, the White Sox won a tiebreaker 1–0 against the Minnesota Twins for the American League playoff spot after a diving catch from Brian Anderson. A game saving throw to home plate from center-fielder Ken Griffey Jr. to catcher A. J. Pierzynski on a flyout to keep Michael Cuddyer from scoring would keep the Twins scoreless through the top of the 5th inning. John Danks pitched on only three days rest and threw 103 pitches for 2 hits and no runs in eight innings. Bobby Jenks would close the game with a perfect 9th. The only run of the game came from a Jim Thome home run, the 541st of his career. This was the lowest scoring tiebreaker game in MLB history. The White Sox are also the only team in MLB history to beat three different teams on three consecutive days: the Cleveland Indians, Detroit Tigers, and Minnesota Twins. They lost to the Tampa Bay Rays in the ALDS, 3 games to 1.

=== 2009 season ===
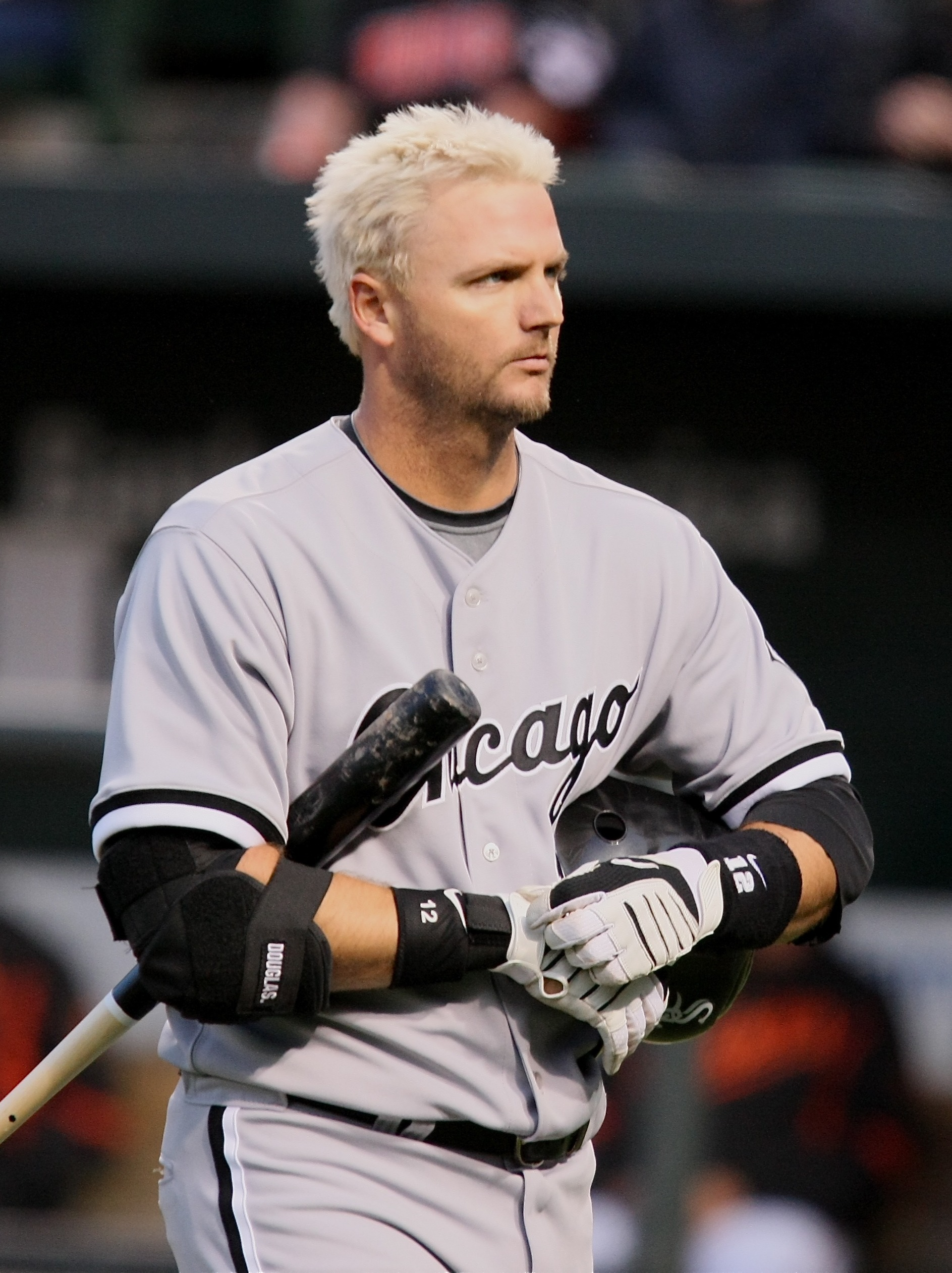
A. J. Pierzynski, April 2009

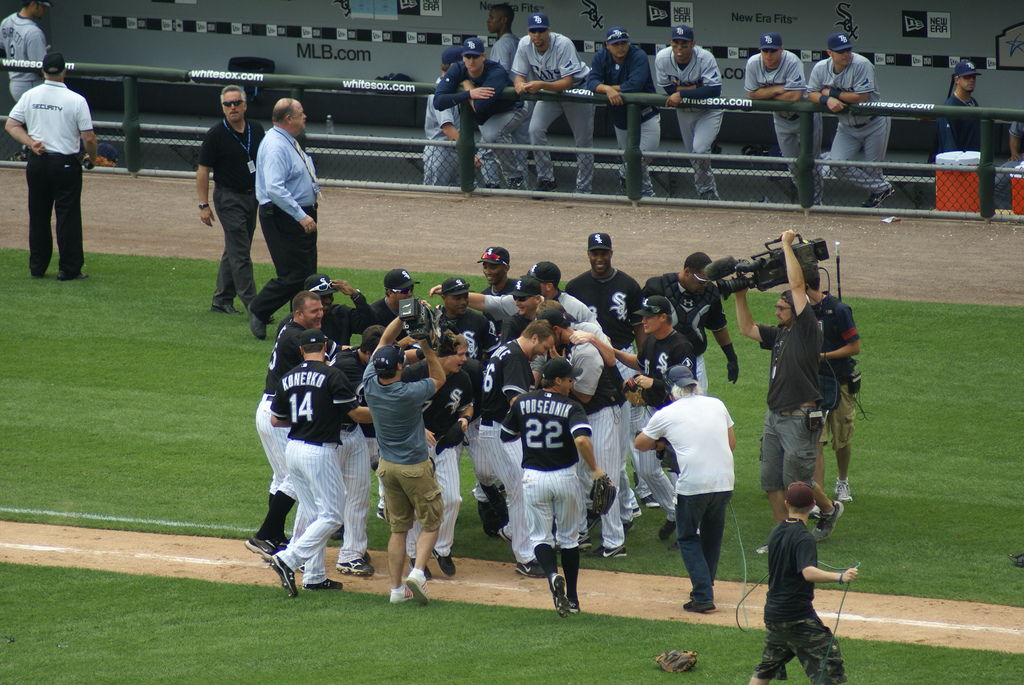
Teammates celebrate Mark Buehrle's perfect game, July 23, 2009

During the 2009 offseason the White Sox declined a team option for Ken Griffey Jr. The White Sox also let Joe Crede become a free agent, who went on to sign with the Minnesota Twins, and signed closer Bobby Jenks to a one-year contract, avoiding arbitration. Pitcher Bartolo Colón was signed as a free agent on January 15. Javier Vázquez and Boone Logan were traded to the Atlanta Braves for prospects Tyler Flowers, Brent Lillibridge, Jon Gilmore and Santos Rodriguez.

On June 4, the White Sox called up 2008 number one draft pick (eighth overall), shortstop Gordon Beckham. It took Beckham only 364 days to reach the Major Leagues, as he was drafted on June 5, 2008.

On June 9, the White Sox called up another number one draft pick (2007, 25th overall), left-handed pitcher Aaron Poreda.

On July 23, White Sox pitcher Mark Buehrle threw a perfect game against the Tampa Bay Rays. It was his second career no-hitter, both with the White Sox, and the second perfect game in team history. After the game, Buehrle was in the middle of his press conference with the media when he received a phone call from President Barack Obama to congratulate him. It was the second time in two weeks that President Obama and Buehrle had contact, with the first being at the 2009 All-Star game in St. Louis, Missouri.

On July 28 Mark Buehrle established a new major league baseball record, by retiring Minnesota Twin (And former teammate) Joe Crede, Buehrle retired his 42nd consecutive batter, breaking the record held by teammate Bobby Jenks, and Jim Barr, Buehrle would retire three more batters. He holds the all-time record now at 45.

On July 31, the White Sox traded 2007 number one draft pick (25th overall), pitcher Aaron Poreda, Clayton Richard, Adam Russell and Dexter Carter in exchange for Jake Peavy.

On August 10, the White Sox claimed OF Alex Ríos off waivers from the Toronto Blue Jays

On August 31, Jim Thome waived his no-trade clause, allowing the White Sox to trade him to the Los Angeles Dodgers, and pick up center fielder Justin Fuller. The White Sox also trade José Contreras to the Colorado Rockies, in exchange for Brandon Hynick, a 24-year-old right-handed starter.

=== 2010 season ===
On the Opening Day, the White Sox shutout the Cleveland 6–0. On that day, Mark Buehrle made an astounding play when he hurried and picked up a ball with his glove in foul territory and quickly underthrew backwards with his glove to Paul Konerko, who caught the ball with his bare hand to force out Lou Marson in the fifth inning for the second out. Paul Konerko broke the franchise record for most home runs hit during the month of April with 11.

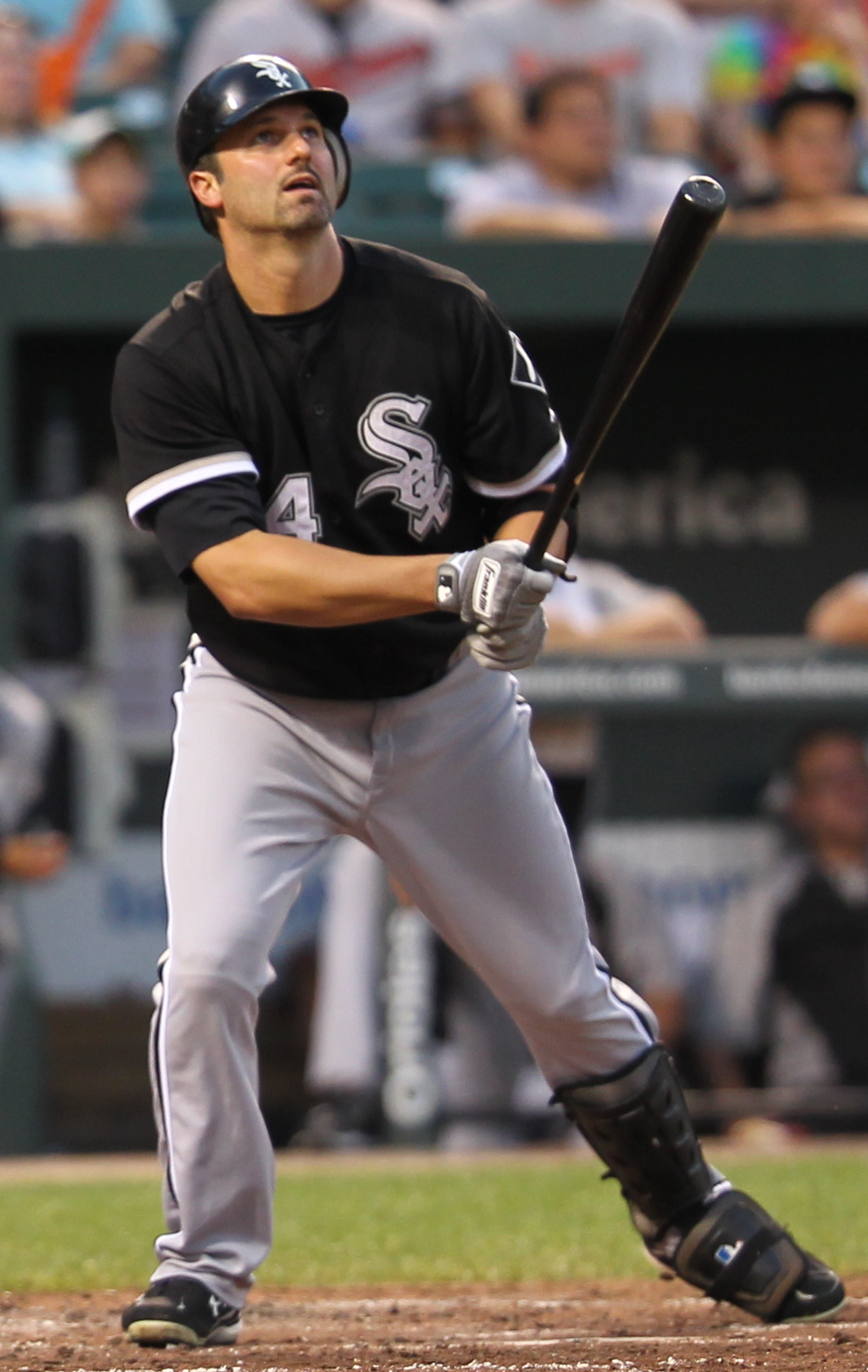
Paul Konerko, August 2011

On May 11, the Sox opened the two-game series at the new Target Field and took the victory 5–2 over Minnesota, but the next day lost 3–2.

On August 29, The White Sox hosted Frank Thomas day at U.S. Cellular field against the New York Yankees. Frank Thomas's Jersey was retired that day. The White Sox Organization also printed his face on the legendary wall in Left-Center field with other number retirees Billy Pierce to his left and Carlton Fisk to his right. Thomas's image also appears under the printed words 'The Catch,' commemorating DeWayne Wise's catch to preserve Mark Buehrle's perfect game in 2009.

=== 2011 season: "All In" ===
Following a busy off season, in which the White Sox signed big name free agent Adam Dunn and re-signed first baseman Paul Konerko and catcher A. J. Pierzynski the White Sox, the 2011 White Sox ended the season with a 79–83 record.

Some notable events for the 2011 season included unveiling of a bronze statue of former White Sox slugger Frank Thomas and the poor season of Adam Dunn in his debut as the White Sox designated hitter.

The end of the season was marked by the end of former World Series-winning manager Ozzie Guillén, who departed a few days before the end of the regular season, eventually signing as manager with the Florida Marlins. Shortly after the 2011 season, the White Sox announced former third baseman Robin Ventura as their new manager, succeeding interim manager Don Cooper.

=== 2012 season ===
On April 21, Philip Humber threw the third perfect game in franchise history against the Seattle Mariners at Safeco Field in Seattle, Washington, as the Chicago won 3–0. It was the 21st perfect game in MLB history. The White Sox were leading the Central Division until the last weeks of the season where they lost many games and ended up 3 games behind the eventual AL Champions, the Detroit Tigers. Their final record was 85–77.

=== 2013 season ===
The Sox had the coldest opening day in 106 years, equalling the April 18, 1907 record of 38 °F (3.3 °C). They won the game 1–0. However, the White Sox finished last in the AL Central and had the second worst record in the American League, losing 99 games – their first season losing more than 95 games since 1976.

=== 2014 season ===
In 2014, the White Sox had a 73–89 record and finished fourth in the AL Central. First baseman José Abreu was named the American League Rookie of the Year, winning the team triple crown with a .317 batting average, 36 home runs and 107 RBIs.

=== 2015 season ===
The White Sox had an aggressive offseason following the 2014 season, signing free agents David Robertson and Melky Cabrera to multi-year contracts and trading for pitcher Jeff Samardzija. However, the acquisitions seemed to have little effect on the team's performance, as they finished the 2015 season in fourth place with a 76–86 record.

=== 2016 season ===
The White Sox began the 2016 season on a strong note, leading the American League with a 23–10 record on May 9. The success did not last, however, as the White Sox finished with a 78–84 record and again placed fourth in the AL Central. Robin Ventura resigned as the team manager after the season. He was replaced by Rick Renteria.

=== 2017 season: Start of the rebuild ===
In the 2017 offseason, the White Sox began to trade players for prospects. On December 6, 2016, the White Sox traded starting pitcher Chris Sale to the Boston Red Sox for outfielder Luis Alexander Basabe, pitcher Víctor Díaz, pitcher Michael Kopech, and infielder Yoán Moncada. The following day, they traded outfielder Adam Eaton to the Washington Nationals for pitchers Dane Dunning, Lucas Giolito, and Reynaldo López. During the season on July 13, 2017, the White Sox traded starting pitcher José Quintana to the Chicago Cubs for pitcher Dylan Cease, infielder Bryany Flete, outfielder Eloy Jiménez, and utility player Matt Rose. In 2017, the White Sox fell to 67–95 and again finished fourth in the AL Central. José Abreu led the American League with 343 total bases.

=== 2018 season ===
2018 was the worst season for the Chicago White Sox since 1970, as they finished with a 62–100 record and placed fourth in the AL Central for the fifth year in a row.

=== 2019 season ===
In 2019, the White Sox finished third in the AL Central, their highest position since 2012, with a 72–89 record. José Abreu led the American League with 123 RBIs.

=== 2020 Season: Back in the playoffs ===
In 2020, the White Sox went all in after a long rebuild. They signed big-time free agents like catcher Yasmani Grandal, pitchers Dallas Keuchel and Gio González, and Edwin Encarnación. The team finished second in the AL Central with a record of 35–25 in the pandemic-shortened season and clinched a playoff spot for the first time since 2008. The Sox unfortunately lost in the Wild Card Series against the Oakland Athletics 2 games to 1. José Abreu won the American League MVP award, becoming the fourth player in White Sox history to do so.

=== 2021 season: Central Division champs again and back to back playoff appearances ===
During the 2020–21 offseason, the White Sox fired manager Rick Renteria and brought back Tony La Russa to take his place. La Russa had not managed a team since 2011 and became the oldest person to manage an MLB team at the age of 76. During the offseason, the White Sox made some more big moves. They traded for Texas Rangers starting pitcher Lance Lynn and signed arguably the best closer in the league in Liam Hendriks to a four year, $54M contract. On June 6, La Russa won his 2,764th game as a manager, surpassing John McGraw for second on the all-time managerial wins list. On August 12, the White Sox played in the first Field of Dreams game in Dyersville, Iowa against the New York Yankees. The White Sox won the game 9–8 on a walk-off home run by Tim Anderson. On September 23, the White Sox clinched the American League Central Division for the first time since 2008 while also clinching back-to-back postseason berths for the first time in franchise history. Overall in 2021, the White Sox had a record of 93–69, their first 90 win season since 2006. The White Sox lost the ALDS to the Houston Astros in four games.

=== 2022 season: Regression ===
Before the lockout, the White Sox signed Kendall Graveman on November 30, 2021, to a three-year, $24M contract. After the lockout ended, the Sox signed pitchers Joe Kelly (two year, $17M) and Vince Velasquez (one year, $3M) on March 14, 2022. The next day, they signed second baseman Josh Harrison to a one-year $5.5M contract. They picked up Craig Kimbrel's option months before and on April 1, the Sox traded Kimbrel to the Los Angeles Dodgers for outfielder A. J. Pollock. On April 3, the Sox traded catcher Zack Collins to the Toronto Blue Jays for catcher Reese McGuire. The White Sox were not able to improve themselves with these transactions, however, as they finished the 2022 season with a record of 81–81, finishing second in the AL Central division.

=== 2023 season: More regression ===
On October 3, 2022, with 3 games left in the regular season, White Sox manager Tony La Russa announced he was stepping down as manager due to health concerns. On November 1, 2022, the White Sox hired Kansas City Royals bench coach Pedro Grifol as their next manager. During the offseason, they signed pitcher Mike Clevinger to a one year, $12 million contract and outfielder Andrew Benintendi to a franchise record five year, $75 million contract. But the new management hires and signings never panned out as the 2023 White Sox season was a disaster. The White Sox started the first month of the season with a record of 8-21. At that point, fans began calling for ownership to sell the team and a White Sox fan called the local ESPN 1000 radio show hosted by Tom Waddle and Marc Silverman and went on a nearly 7 minute long rant about the team. By the all-star break, the White Sox were 38-54 and were the 3rd worst team in the AL with underperformance and injuries plaguing the team. By late July, the White Sox began a fire sale in which they traded many key players for prospects. On July 26, they traded pitchers Lucas Giolito and Reynaldo López to the Los Angeles Angels. On July 28, they traded pitcher Kendall Graveman to the Houston Astros and pitchers Lance Lynn and Joe Kelly to the Los Angeles Dodgers. On August 1 they traded pitcher Keynan Middleton to the New York Yankees and infielder Jake Burger to the Miami Marlins. On August 22, the White Sox fired general manager Rick Hahn and executive vice president Kenny Williams after the team was 49–76 by the time of their firings. The White Sox promoted assistant general manager Chris Getz as the new Senior Vice President and general manager. The White Sox finished the season with their 5th 100 loss season in franchise history with a record of 61–101.

=== 2024 season: Most losses in the modern era ===
In 2024, the White Sox started the season with the worst record through their first 25 games at 3–22, tying them with the 2003 Detroit Tigers and the 2022 Cincinnati Reds behind the 1988 Baltimore Orioles who went 2–23 through their first 25 games while also making MLB history by getting shutout 8 times in their first 22 games. The team also had three losing streaks of 10 or more games, including breaking two franchise records for losing streaks with a 14-game losing streak from May 22 to June 6 and a 21-game losing streak after the All-Star break from July 10 to August 5, tying a AL record with the 1988 Orioles. The White Sox broke the MLB record for the most losses by the All-Star break as they were a league worst 27–71 by the All-Star break. On August 8, manager Pedro Grifol, bench coach Charlie Montoyo, 3rd base coach Eddie Rodríguez, and assistant hitting coach Mike Tosar were all fired after the team was 28–89. Grifol ended his manager tenure with a record of 89–190. The White Sox appointed baserunning coach Grady Sizemore as interim manager. From July 6 to September 3, the White Sox were 5–45, the worst 50-game span for a major league team since the 1916 Philadelphia Athletics. On August 17, the White Sox were officially eliminated from playoff contention becoming the earliest to be eliminated since the divisional era began in 1969, a record that was previously held by the 2018 Baltimore Orioles. On September 1, the White Sox lost their 107th game, breaking their franchise record for most losses in a season they'd held since 1970. On September 27, the White Sox lost their 121st game of the season, surpassing the 1962 Mets for the most losses in modern MLB history. The White Sox finished the season with a record of 41–121, the worst record in the modern era of Major League Baseball and the 5th worst win percentage in the modern era of Major League Baseball with a win percentage of .253 putting them behind the 1904 Washington Senators (.252), the 1962 New York Mets (.250), the 1935 Boston Braves (.248), and the 1916 Philadelphia Athletics (.235).

=== 2025 season ===
On October 31, 2024, White Sox hired former Texas Rangers associate manager Will Venable as their new manager. The season was the White Sox's 125th Anniversary season with them doing special giveaways during the season and was the 20th Anniversary of the 2005 World Series championship. The team did a special 2005 World Series reunion weekend on the weekend of July 11–13 with special pre-game ceremonies taking place. The first one was Mark Buehrle getting a statue on the 11th. Then a pre-game ceremony on the 12th with the entire team minus Bobby Jenks, who died 8 days prior from stomach cancer, with Paul Konerko throwing the ceremonial first pitch to A. J. Pierzynski. And ended with starting pitchers Mark Buehrle, Jon Garland, Freddy García, and José Contreras each throwing out the first pitch on the 13th in honor of the four former World Series champions pitching complete games in the 2005 American League Championship Series.

== See also ==
- History of the Chicago Cubs
- History of the Chicago Bears
- History of the Chicago Blackhawks
- History of the Chicago Bulls
