= List of Chicago White Sox owners and executives =

This is a list of Chicago White Sox owners and executives.

== Owners ==
Name	Years
Charles Comiskey	1900–1931
J. Louis Comiskey	1931–1939
Grace Comiskey	1940–1956
Dorothy Comiskey Rigney	1956–1959
Bill Veeck	1959–1961; 1975–1981
Arthur Allyn, Jr. and John Allyn	1961–1969
John Allyn	1969–1975
Jerry Reinsdorf and Eddie Einhorn	1981–2016
Jerry Reinsdorf	2017–present

== General managers ==
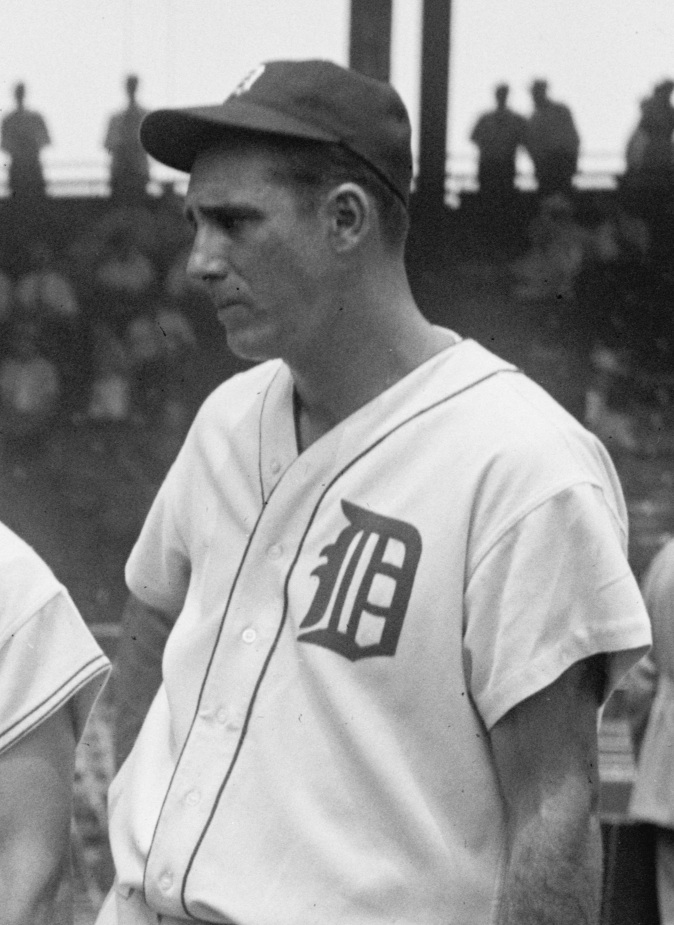
Hank Greenberg, Hall of Famer and two-time MVP

- Harry Grabiner (1915–1945)
- Leslie O'Connor (1946–1948)
- Frank Lane (1948–1955)
- Chuck Comiskey (1956–1958)
- Johnny Rigney (1956–1958)
- Hank Greenberg (1959–1961)
- Ed Short (1961–1970)
- Stu Holcomb (1970–1973)
- Roland Hemond (1973–1985)
- Ken Harrelson (1985–June 1986)
- Tom Haller (June 1986–October 1986)
- Larry Himes (1986–1990)
- Ron Schueler (1990–2000)
- Kenny Williams (2000–2012)
- Rick Hahn (2012–2023)
- Chris Getz (2023–present)

== Other executives ==
- Bill DeWitt
- Dave Dombrowski
- Scott Reifert
- Terry Savarise
- David Wilder
