= Johnny Rigney =

American baseball player (1914–1984)

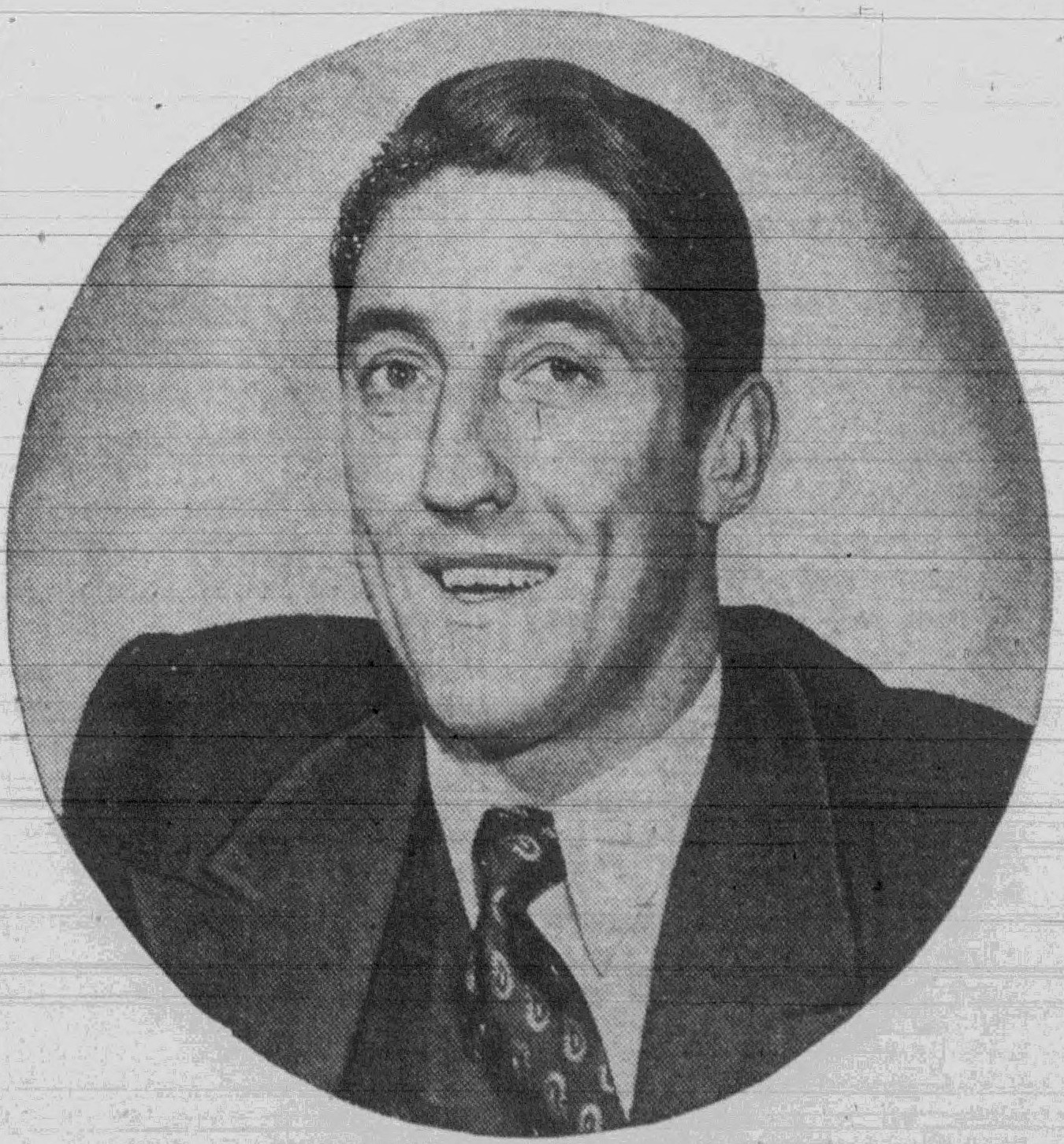
- Rigney, circa 1942
- Pitcher
- Born: October 28, 1914; Oak Park, Illinois, U.S.
- Died: October 21, 1984 (aged 69); Lombard, Illinois, U.S.
- Batted: Right Threw: Right

MLB debut
- April 21, 1937, for the Chicago White Sox

Last MLB appearance
- July 4, 1947, for the Chicago White Sox

MLB statistics
- Win–loss record: 63–64
- Earned run average: 3.59
- Strikeouts: 605
- Stats at Baseball Reference

Teams
- Chicago White Sox (1937–1942, 1946–1947)

John Dungan Rigney (October 28, 1914 – October 21, 1984) was an American professional baseball starting pitcher in Major League Baseball who played his entire career for the Chicago White Sox (1937–1942 and 1946–1947). Listed at 6 ft 2 in (1.88 m), 190 pounds (86 kg), Rigney batted and threw right-handed. A native of River Forest, Illinois, he was signed out of the University of St. Thomas.

== Professional career ==
Rigney was one of the Chicago White Sox top pitchers in the years prior to World War II. His most productive season came in 1939, when he won a career-high 15 games, including the first win for a pitcher during the first night game ever played at Comiskey Park (August 14). In 1940, he recorded 14 wins with a career-best 3.11 ERA, pitching an 11-inning, 1–0 shutout against the visitors New York Yankees (June 20). It was the first time since 1919 that the Yankees had been shut out in extra innings by one pitcher. After that, he won 13 games in 1941 and was 3–3 before joining the United States Navy in May 1942. After being discharged in 1945, he returned to Chicago, but his playing time was limited by arm injuries. He retired after the 1947 season.

=== Management career ===
Following his playing retirement, Rigney took a position in the White Sox front office, becoming farm system director in 1947. In October 1955, he became the club's co-general manager, along with brother-in-law Chuck Comiskey, replacing Frank Lane. He departed the post when his wife sold her 54 percent share of the White Sox to Bill Veeck in 1959.

=== Career statistics ===
In an eight-season career, Rigney posted a 63–64 record with 605 strikeouts and a 3.59 ERA in 197 appearances, including 132 starts, 66 complete games, 10 shutouts, five saves, and 1,186 1/3 innings of work.

== Personal life ==
Rigney married Dorothy Comiskey, granddaughter of Charles Comiskey, founding owner of the White Sox, and daughter of J. Louis Comiskey, another former club president.

Rigney died at a nursing home in Lombard, Illinois on October 21, 1984, a week shy of his 70th birthday.

== See also ==
- Chicago White Sox managers and ownership

Preceded by Frank Lane	Chicago White Sox General manager 1955–1960 (co-general manager with Chuck Comiskey from 1956)	Succeeded by Hank Greenberg
