= List of female Major League Baseball principal owners =

Women who have owned Major League Baseball teams

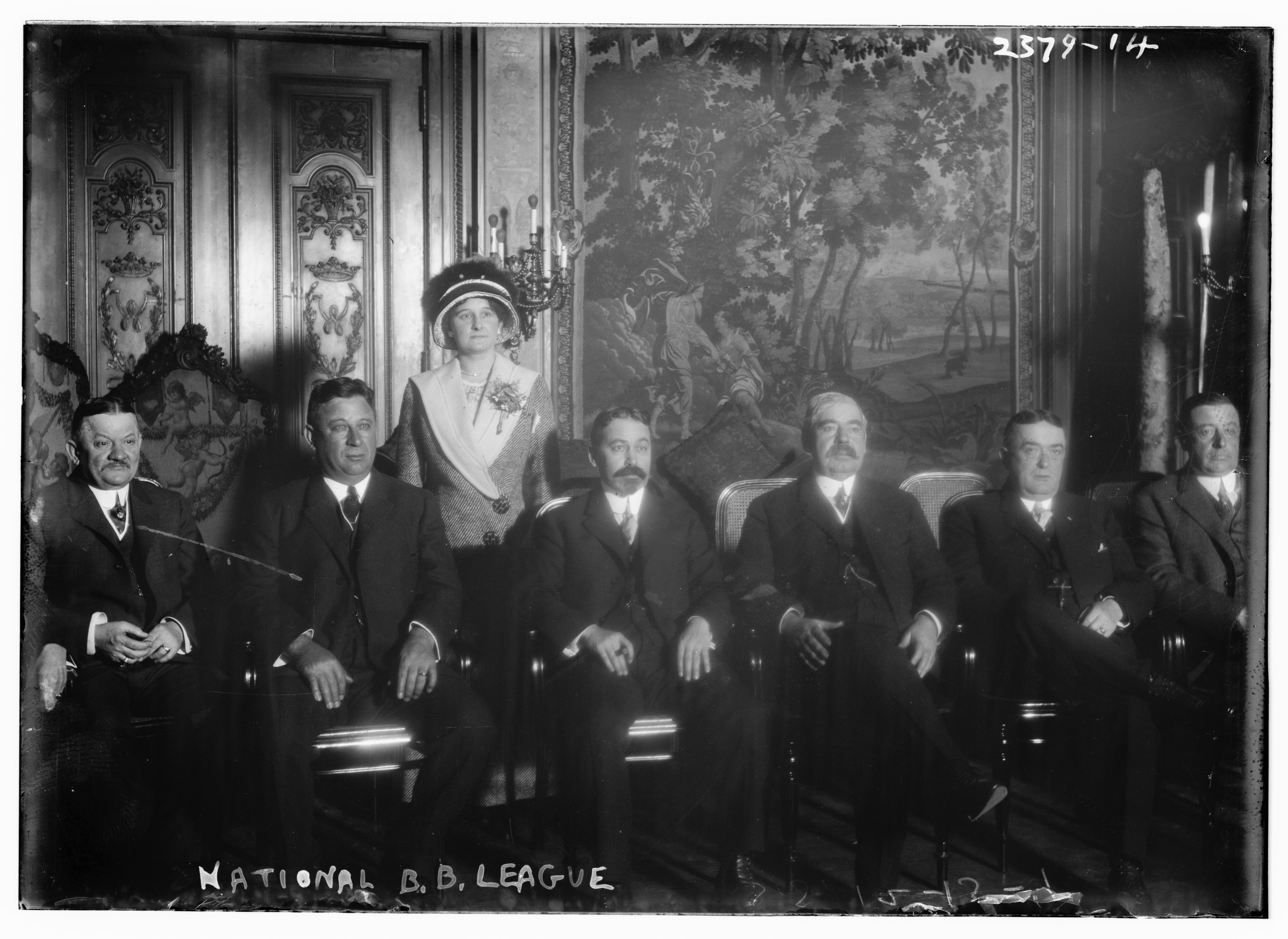
National League owners at the December 1911 league meeting; Helene Hathaway Britton is the only woman present.

Since the beginning of Major League Baseball, women have rarely held high executive positions in team franchises. On occasion, however, women have ended as majority owners of Major League franchises. Most often, they end up inheriting their team from their families. As a result, there have been fourteen women who have held the controlling stakes of a franchise in the league's history.

The first female owner in MLB history was Helene Hathaway Britton, the daughter of Frank Robison and the niece of Stanley Robison. She inherited the St. Louis Cardinals from her uncle upon his death and, despite pressure to sell from fellow male owners, chose to retain ownership and control of the team and took an active part in running it until financial issues forced her to sell. Grace Comiskey inherited the team from her husband J. Louis Comiskey and became team President, the first woman in the American League to hold a high executive role. Her daughter Dorothy Comiskey Rigney inherited the team from her.

Two women have independently owned majority stakes of an MLB franchise without inheriting it. Joan Whitney Payson, previously a minority owner of the New York Giants, was the first owner of the New York Mets and played a big role in bringing the National League back to New York City after the Giants and Brooklyn Dodgers moved to the West Coast. She was the first woman to own a team without having inherited it. Marge Schott was the first woman to purchase a Major League franchise when she bought the Cincinnati Reds in 1984.

Additionally, a number of women have inherited the team upon the death of a family member but delegated the business of running to someone else. For instance, Edith Dunn, the wife of Cleveland Indians owner Jim Dunn, was the first woman in the American League and second overall to own a franchise but did not take part in its day-to-day operations, instead letting general manager Ernest Barnard run the team until she sold it upon remarrying in 1927. Unusually, baseball executive Mae Nugent inherited the majority shares of the Philadelphia Phillies from owners William and Laura Baker upon their deaths but her husband Gerald Nugent ran the day-to-day operations.

== Principal owners ==
The following is a list of women who have held the majority stake in a Major League Baseball franchise:

List of female principal MLB owners
Name	Portrait	Major League team(s)	Ownership tenure	Notes	Ref.
Helene Hathaway Britton		St. Louis Cardinals	1911–1918	Inherited team from uncle, Stanley Robison.; Vice President of the St. Louis Cardinals from 1913 to 1916 and then President from 1916 to 1918.	
Edith Dunn		Cleveland Indians	1922–1927	Inherited team from husband, Jim Dunn.	
Laura Baker		Philadelphia Phillies	1930–1934	Inherited team from husband, William Baker.	
Mae Nugent		Philadelphia Phillies	1934–1942	Received minority shares of the team upon death of William Baker; received remaining shares upon death of Laura Baker, alongside son Gerald Nugent, effectively giving her majority control of the team.; Vice President of the Philadelphia Phillies from 1934 to 1942; husband Gerald Nugent served as President.	
Florence W. Dreyfuss		Pittsburgh Pirates	1932–1949	Inherited team from husband, Barney Dreyfuss.	
Grace Comiskey		Chicago White Sox	1939–1956	Inherited team from husband, J. Louis Comiskey.; President of the Chicago White Sox from 1941 to 1956.	
Dorothy Comiskey Rigney		Chicago White Sox	1956–1958	Inherited team from mother, Grace Comiskey.	
Joan Whitney Payson		New York Mets	1962–1975	First woman to independently own an MLB team without inheriting it.; President of the New York Mets from 1962 to 1975.	
Jean R. Yawkey		Boston Red Sox	1976–1992	Inherited team from husband, Tom Yawkey.; President of the Boston Red Sox from 1976 to 1987.	
Terry O'Malley Seidler		Los Angeles Dodgers	1979–1998	Inherited team from father, Walter O'Malley; owned half the shares, alongside brother Peter O'Malley.; Secretary to the Los Angeles Dodgers Board of Directors from 1981 to 1998.	
Marge Schott		Cincinnati Reds	1984–1999	First woman to purchase an MLB team.; President of the Cincinnati Reds from 1985 to 1993.	
Joan Kroc		San Diego Padres	1984–1990	Inherited team from husband, Ray Kroc.	
Jackie Autry		Los Angeles Angels	1998–1999	Inherited team from husband, Gene Autry.	
Wendy Selig-Prieb		Milwaukee Brewers	1998–2004	Team controlling share was transferred to her from her father, Bud Selig upon his becoming Commissioner of Baseball in 1998.; President of the Milwaukee Brewers from 1998 to 2001.	

== See also ==
- Effa Manley, owner of the Newark Eagles of the Negro leagues and a member of the Baseball Hall of Fame
- Women in baseball
- List of Major League Baseball principal owners
