= Grace Comiskey =

American baseball executive

- Born: Grace Elizabeth Reidy; May 15, 1893; Chicago, Illinois, U.S.
- Died: December 10, 1956 (aged 63); Chicago, Illinois, U.S.
- Occupations: Baseball owner and executive
- Spouse: J. Louis Comiskey (m. 1913; died 1939)
- Children: Dorothy; Charles II
- Relatives: Charles Comiskey (father-in-law); Johnny Rigney (son-in-law)

Grace Elizabeth Reidy Comiskey (May 15, 1893 – December 10, 1956) was an American businesswoman who was the owner of the Chicago White Sox of the American League from 1939 through 1956. Comiskey was the daughter-in-law of Charles Comiskey and inherited control of the White Sox upon the death of her husband, J. Louis Comiskey.

== Early life ==
Comiskey was born on May 15, 1893, in Chicago to parents Thomas and Elizabeth Reidy alongside two other siblings. She was educated at Adelphi College.

In 1912, when she was invited to attend Chicago White Sox baseball game between the Chicago Cubs, Comiskey met her future-husband J. Louis Comiskey. She married Comiskey in September 1913 and they spent their honeymoon following the Chicago White Sox and New York Giants World Tour co-ordinated by her father-in-law Charles Comiskey.

== Career and death ==
Upon the death her husband in 1939, Comiskey inherited control of the White Sox of the American League from 1939 through 1956. Prior to gaining control, she entered into a legal battle with the First National Bank of Chicago who wished to sell the Comiskey's stock in the team to make up for lost earning. Eventually, Judge John F. O'Connell denied the banks' right to solicit bids for sale or stock in the White Sox. In 1941, Comiskey petitioned the Court to release her dowry rights, which would have been held as part of the estate until her youngest son reached 21, in order to purchase more stock. Once she was awarded the $60,000, she bought 1,000 shares in the White Sox, enough to regain controlling interest.

On March 4, 1941, Comiskey was formally elected president of the White Sox by the team's board of directors, becoming the first woman president of an American League baseball team. When speaking about her milestone achievement, Comiskey said: “I believe a woman can fulfill the duties capably.” During her tenure with the White Sox, Comiskey was described as an "uncompromising, dowager who ruled the baseball club –and her family– with a velvet fist." This caused conflict between her and her son Charles, who quit the organization after Comiskey reneged on her promise of a raise. By her fifth year as president, the White Sox had increased home attendance by 10%. She retained Jimmy Dykes as White Sox manager until 1946.

Comiskey died of a heart attack in 1956 and control of the White Sox passed to Comiskey's eldest daughter, Dorothy Comiskey Rigney.

== See also ==
- Women in baseball
- List of female Major League Baseball principal owners
