= Chuck Comiskey =

American baseball team co-owner and executive

- Born: November 19, 1925; Chicago, U.S.
- Died: August 26, 2007 (aged 81); Hinsdale, Illinois, U.S.
- Occupations: Major League Baseball team co-owner and executive
- Years active: 1948–1961

Charles Albert Comiskey II (November 19, 1925 – August 26, 2007) was part-owner of the Chicago White Sox from 1956 to 1961. A native of Chicago, Comiskey was the grandson of the team's founder, Charles Comiskey.

== White Sox ownership ==
Comiskey's father, Lou, inherited the team after Charles Comiskey's death in 1931. When Lou died in 1939, ownership passed to his wife and Chuck's mother, Grace Comiskey. Chuck joined the family business in 1948 and was appointed vice president. During his time in the White Sox front office, Comiskey played an important role in developing the minor league system of the Go-Go Sox teams of the late 1950s, ultimately culminating with the team's winning the American League championship in 1959.

In 1956, Comiskey became co-general manager along with his brother-in-law Johnny Rigney, replacing Frank Lane. His mother died later that year, and in her will control of the team was split between Comiskey and his older sister, Dorothy. Comiskey received a 46% stake, making him the team's second largest shareholder. However, he felt the team was his birthright, and spent the next two years trying to wrest control of the team from his sister. After a lengthy court battle, Dorothy opted to sell the team to Comiskey after the 1958 season. Believing that Dorothy wouldn't consider any offers from outside the family, Comiskey made a fairly low offer. Dorothy responded by selling her 54% stake to a group headed by Bill Veeck. However, Comiskey refused to sell his interest and remained as the team's largest single shareholder. This forced Veeck to incur over a million dollars in additional taxes.

In 1961, Veeck sold his stake to Arthur and John Allyn. Seeing a chance to finally gain control of the team, Comiskey sold his stock to a group headed by Chicago insurance magnate William Bartholomay. Comiskey promised Bartholomay that he would be able to overwhelm the Allyns with an offer for total control, allowing him an opportunity to buy the team. However, the Allyns turned Bartholomay down. This ended the Comiskey family's 62-year involvement with the White Sox.

== Later life ==
In the early 1970s, Comiskey owned and operated Carriage Transfer, a Hinsdale taxi and limousine company. While baseball was no longer his profession, he remained a lifelong White Sox fan and season-ticket holder. He was nonetheless disappointed when Comiskey Park, built by his grandfather in 1910 and synonymous with South Side baseball for eight decades, gave way to a new Comiskey Park in 1991 (later renamed U.S. Cellular Field). The name change did not diminish his enthusiasm when Chicago won the 2005 World Series, the team's first championship since 1917.

Comiskey died in his sleep at his home in Hinsdale on August 26, 2007, age 82.

== See also ==
- Chicago White Sox managers and ownership

== Sources ==
- Baseball Almanac
- "Chicago Tribune". Chicago Tribune.
- MLB official site

Preceded by Frank Lane	Chicago White Sox General Manager; 1955–1960 (with Johnny Rigney)	Succeeded by Hank Greenberg
