= Dorothy Comiskey Rigney =

American baseball executive

Dorothy Elizabeth Comiskey Rigney (December 26, 1916 – January 22, 1971) was an American businesswoman who owned the Chicago White Sox of the American League from 1956 through 1958. She is one of the few women to have served as principal owner of a Major League Baseball team.

== Biography ==
Rigney was born in Chicago to John Louis Comiskey (1885–1939) and Grace Elizabeth Reidy (1894–1956). She was the eldest grandchild of Charles Comiskey, and inherited control of the White Sox upon the death of her mother. In 1941, she married White Sox pitcher and future executive Johnny Rigney.

For most of her tenure as owner, Dorothy was in a running battle for control of the team with her younger brother, Chuck, who was the team's second-largest stockholder. When Dorothy put the team on the market after the 1958 season, she initially wanted to sell her 54% stake to her brother. However, Chuck made such a lowball offer that Dorothy instead sold the White Sox to Bill Veeck, ending the Comiskey family's 58-year control of the franchise.

Dorothy Rigney also owned and raced Thoroughbred horses. One of her most successful runners was multiple stakes race winner, Fast Hilarious, whose wins included the 1969 American Derby and the 1971 Gulfstream Park Handicap.

She died at a Maywood, Illinois, hospital in 1971 at the age of 54.

== See also ==
- Women in baseball
- List of female Major League Baseball principal owners
