= Charles Comiskey =

American baseball player, manager, team owner (1859–1931)

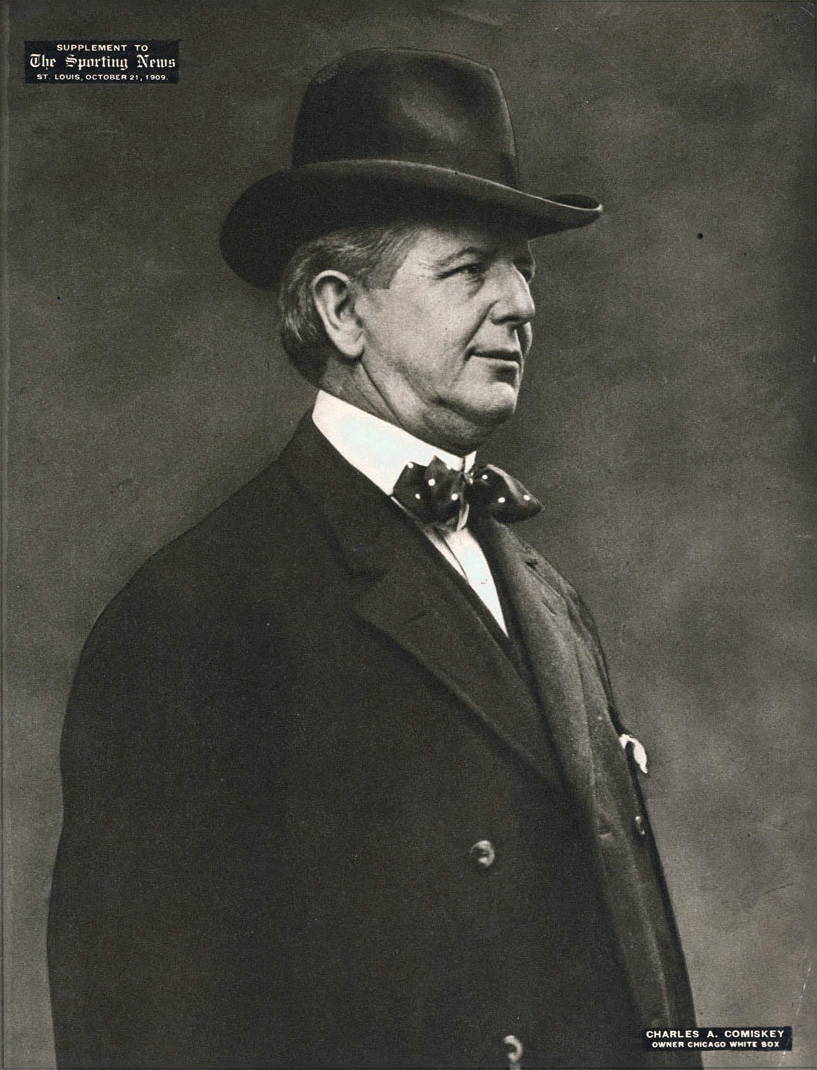
- Comiskey c. 1909
- First baseman / Manager / Owner
- Born: August 15, 1859; Chicago, Illinois, U.S.
- Died: October 26, 1931 (aged 72); Eagle River, Wisconsin, U.S.
- Batted: Right Threw: Right

MLB debut
- May 2, 1882, for the St. Louis Brown Stockings

Last MLB appearance
- September 12, 1894, for the Cincinnati Reds

MLB statistics
- Batting average: .264
- Home runs: 28
- Runs batted in: 883
- Stolen bases: 416
- Managerial record: 840–541–29
- Winning %: .608
- Stats at Baseball Reference
- Managerial record at Baseball Reference

Teams
- As player: St. Louis Brown Stockings / Browns (1882–1889); Chicago Pirates (1890); St. Louis Browns (1891); Cincinnati Reds (1892–1894); As manager: St. Louis Browns (1883–1889, 1891); Chicago Pirates (1890); Cincinnati Reds (1892–1894); As owner: Chicago White Sox (1901–1931)

Career highlights and awards
- 2× World Series champion (1906, 1917); 4× American Association pennant (1885–1888); St. Louis Cardinals Hall of Fame

Member of the National

Baseball Hall of Fame
- Induction: 1939
- Election method: Old-Timers Committee

Charles Albert Comiskey (August 15, 1859 – October 26, 1931), nicknamed "Commy" or "the Old Roman", was an American professional baseball first baseman, manager, and team owner. He played 13 seasons in the American Association (AA) for the St. Louis Brown Stockings / Browns, the Players' League (PL) for the Chicago Pirates, and the National League (NL) for the Cincinnati Reds. He was a key figure in the formation of the American League and was also the founding owner of the Chicago White Sox. Comiskey Park, the White Sox's storied baseball stadium, was built under his guidance and named for him.

Comiskey's reputation was permanently tarnished by his team's involvement in the Black Sox Scandal, although he was inducted as an executive into the Hall of Fame in 1939.

== Early life ==
Comiskey was born on August 15, 1859, in Chicago, the son of the Irish-born Illinois politician John Comiskey. He attended public and parochial schools in Chicago, including St. Ignatius Preparatory School, and then attended St. Mary's College in St. Mary's, Kansas. He played baseball at St. Mary's and played for several professional teams in Chicago while apprenticed to a plumber and working at construction jobs, including driving a brick delivery wagon for the construction crews building the fifth Chicago City Hall, which stood from 1873 to 1885.

== Baseball career ==
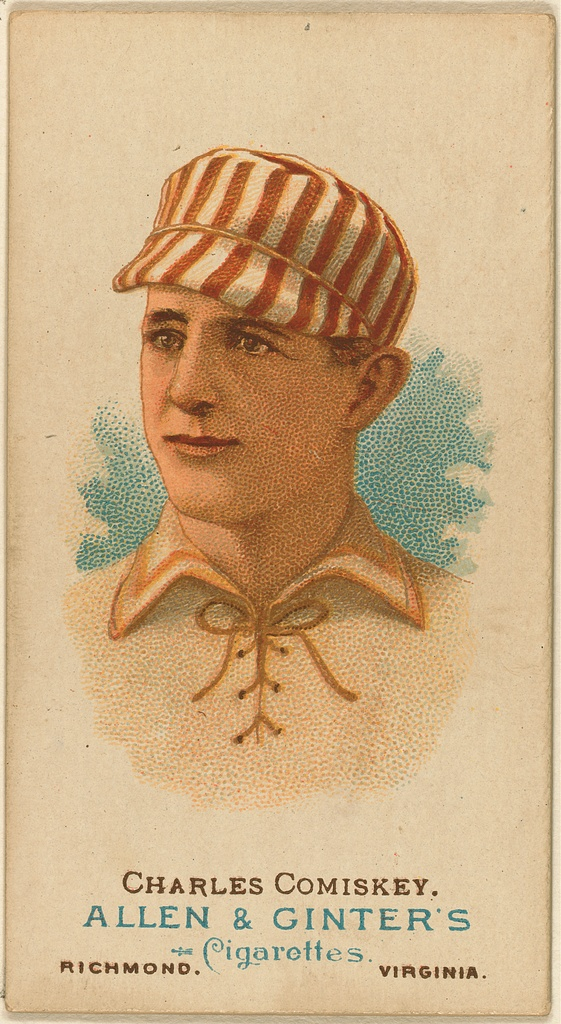
An 1887 baseball card showing Comiskey as a St. Louis Brown

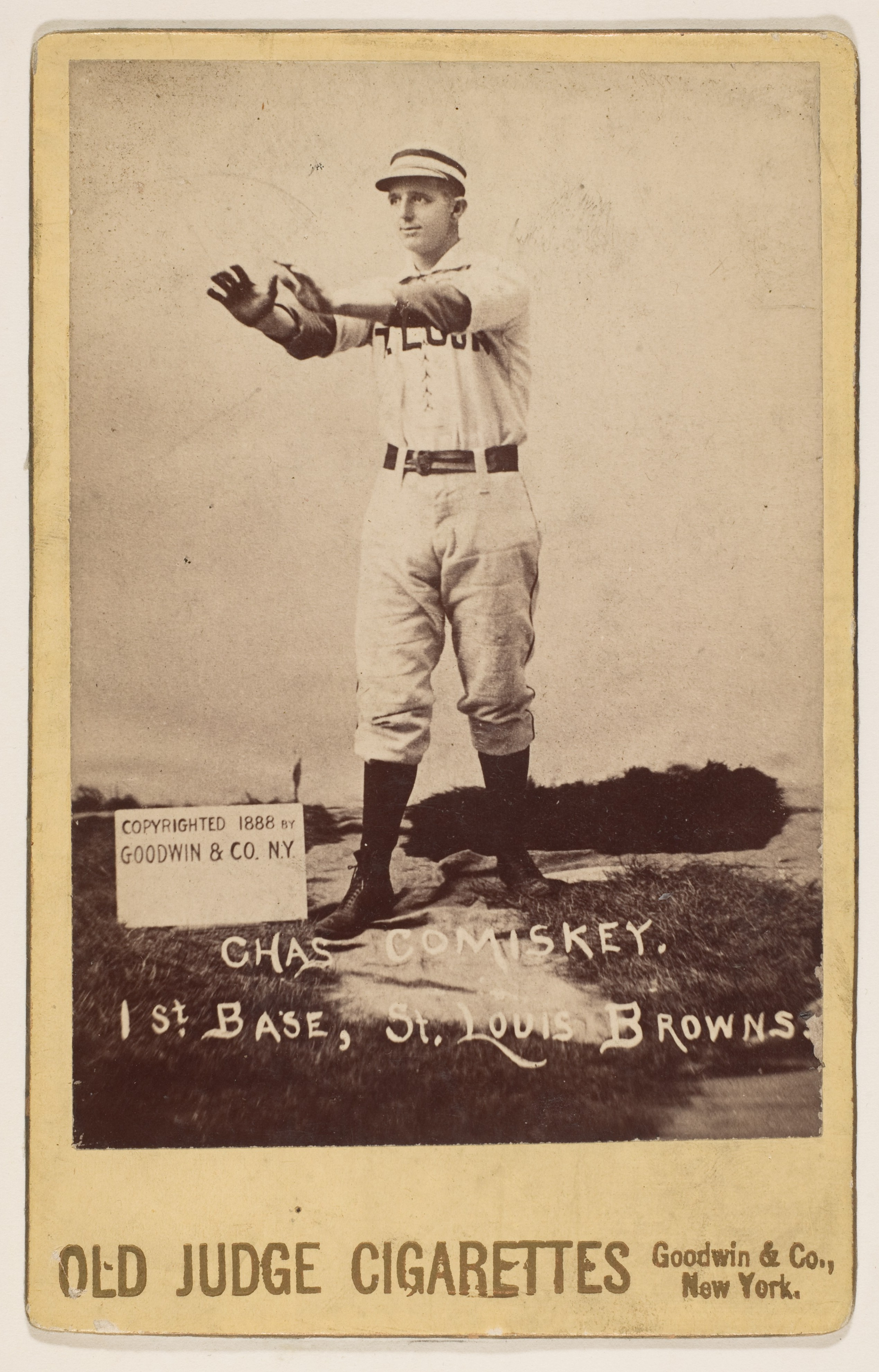
An 1888 baseball card showing Comiskey as a St. Louis Brown

=== Playing and managing career ===
Comiskey started his playing career as a pitcher, and moved to first base after developing arm trouble. He is credited with being the first to play hitters off first base, allowing him to cover balls hit to more of the infield. He entered the American Association in 1882 with the St. Louis Brown Stockings. He managed the team during parts of its first three seasons and became the full-time manager in 1885, leading the Browns to four consecutive American Association championships and a close second in 1889. He also played and managed for the Chicago Pirates in the Players' League (1890), the Browns again (1891), and the Cincinnati Reds in the National League (1892–1894).

=== As an owner ===
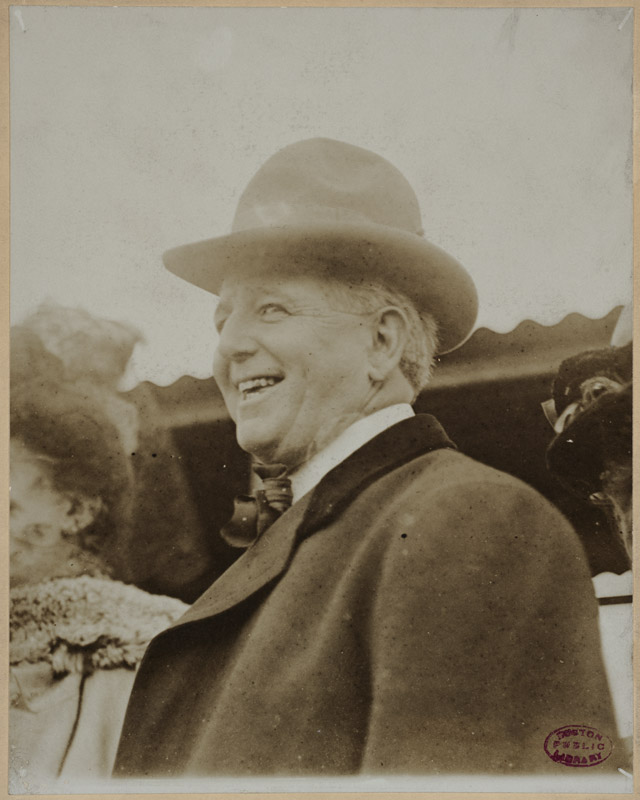
Comiskey, circa 1910

Comiskey left Cincinnati and the majors in fall 1894 to purchase the Western League Sioux City Cornhuskers in Sioux City, Iowa and move it to Saint Paul, Minnesota, renaming the team the St. Paul Saints. He had compiled a .264 batting average with 29 home runs, 883 RBI and 419 stolen bases. As a manager, he posted an 839–542 record. After five seasons of sharing the Twin Cities with another Western League club in Minneapolis, Comiskey and his colleagues arranged to share Chicago with the National League, whose club (the Chicago Cubs today) played on the West Side. The St. Paul Saints moved to the South Side as the White Stockings (also the original name of the Cubs; it was eventually shortened to White Sox) of the renamed American League for the 1900 season. The American League then declared itself a major league starting in 1901.

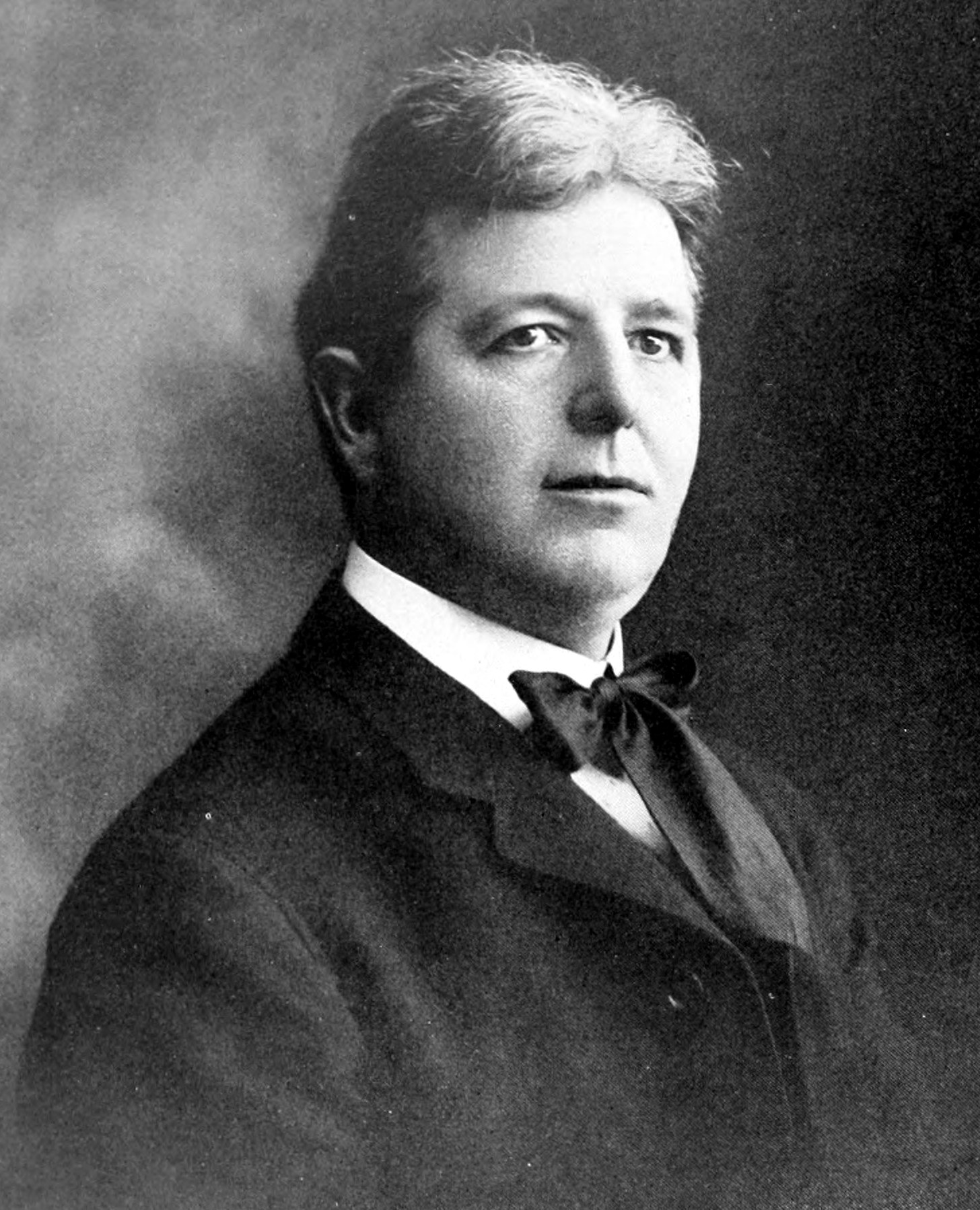
Comiskey, circa 1910

As owner of the White Sox from 1900 until his death in 1931, Comiskey oversaw the construction of Comiskey Park in 1910 and won five American League pennants (1900, 1901, 1906, 1917, 1919) and two World Series (1906, 1917). He lost popularity with his players, who eventually came to despise him. The players' animosity towards Comiskey has been cited as a major cause of the Black Sox scandal, when eight players on the AL champions conspired to "throw" the 1919 World Series to the NL champion Cincinnati Reds. Comiskey was notoriously stingy (his defenders called him "frugal"), even forcing his players to pay to launder their own uniforms. Traci Peterson notes that, in an era when professional athletes lacked free agency, the White Sox's formidable players had little choice but to accept Comiskey's substandard wages. She writes: "Swede Risberg and Lefty Williams made less than $3,000 a year ($55,710 today). Joe Jackson and Buck Weaver made only $6,000 a year ($111,420 today). Eddie Cicotte had been promised a $10,000 ($185,701 today) bonus if he could win 30 games in a season. When Cicotte closed in on the 30-game goal, Comiskey had him benched to keep him from reaching the mark." Comiskey's stated reason for having manager Kid Gleason bench Cicotte was that with the Sox headed for the World Series, he had to protect his star pitcher's arm (Cicotte ended up with a 29–7 record in 1919 ). In one incident, he promised his players a bonus for winning the 1919 pennant — the "bonus" turned out to be a case of flat champagne.

When the scandal broke late in the 1920 season, Comiskey suspended the suspected players via telegram, admitting that he knew this action cost the White Sox a second straight pennant. However, he initially defended the accused players and, in an unusual display of largesse, provided them with expensive legal representation. He ultimately supported baseball commissioner Kenesaw Mountain Landis' decision to ban the implicated White Sox players from further participation in professional baseball, knowing full well that Landis' action would permanently sideline the core of his team. Indeed, the White Sox promptly tumbled into seventh place and would not be a factor in a pennant race again until 1936, five years after Comiskey's death. They did not win another pennant until 1959 and another World Series until 2005.

=== Labor relations and the reserve clause ===
In 1914, Comiskey became involved in a landmark legal case that challenged baseball's reserve clause system, which he had co-authored with Ban Johnson as part of the National Agreement of 1903. When first baseman Hal Chase exercised a 10-day termination clause in his contract to sign with the Buffalo Blues of the Federal League, Comiskey sought an injunction to prevent Chase from playing. In American League Baseball Club of Chicago v. Chase, 149 N.Y.S. 6 (N.Y. Sup. Ct. July 21, 1914), New York Supreme Court Justice Herbert Bissell ruled against Comiskey, finding that organized baseball was "as complete a monopoly of the baseball business for profit as any monopoly can be made" and that this monopoly was "in contravention of the common law in that it invades the right to labor as a property right; in that it invades the right to contract as a property right and in that it is a combination to restrain and control the exercise of a profession or calling."

Following the court's decision, American League president Ban Johnson, Comiskey's longtime associate and co-architect of the reserve clause, declared: "Federal League teams will not get one single player from Charles A. Comiskey, owner of the Chicago White Sox, and if Hal Chase jumps his contract he will never play with any other club." Despite the Federal League folding in 1915, Chase faced persistent allegations of game-fixing throughout his subsequent career, culminating in his ban from baseball in 1920. In a 1918 interview, Johnson acknowledged that Chase had been "overtly blacklisted" for his challenge to the reserve clause and defection to the Federal League.

== Legacy ==
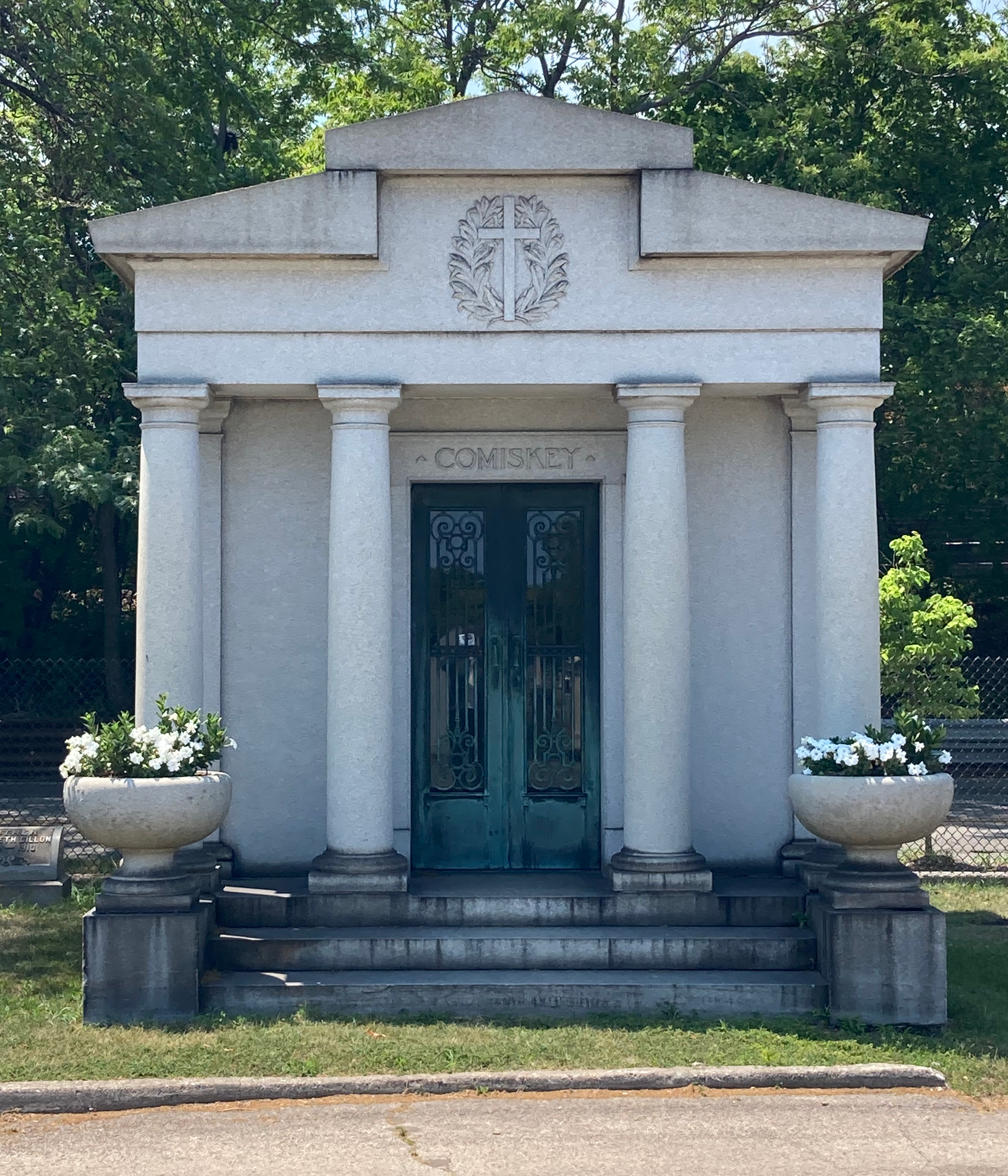
Comiskey mausoleum at Calvary Cemetery

Comiskey is sometimes credited with the innovation of playing the first base position behind first base or inside the foul line, a practice which has since become common. Later, he had played a large role in the dissolution of the National Commission, baseball's former governing body, following a quarrel with Ban Johnson. He was inducted into the National Baseball Hall of Fame in 1939. He was also named to the St. Louis Cardinals Hall of Fame in May 2022, as the selection of Cardinals managing partner William DeWitt Jr. for his accomplishments as manager of the St. Louis Browns.

Comiskey died in Eagle River, Wisconsin in 1931 and was buried at Calvary Cemetery in Evanston. Comiskey's son J. Louis inherited the team but died a few years later. The trustees of his estate were going to sell the team, but J. Louis' widow Grace was able to gain control of the team and avoid a sale. Her two children, Dorothy Comiskey Rigney and Charles "Chuck" Albert Comiskey II (who served in the White Sox front office in the 1940s and 1950s before he became owner), became co-owners of the team following Grace's death in the 1950s. Dorothy sold controlling interest in the team to Bill Veeck in 1958, but Chuck remained a minority owner until 1962.

When the White Sox moved to a new ballpark in 1991, the Comiskey Park name was retained from their previous home (since 1910). It is now known as Rate Field. A statue of Comiskey stands near center field in the new ballpark.

== Career statistics ==
=== As a manager ===
Team	From	To	Record		
Team	From	To	W	L	Win %
St. Louis Browns	1883	1883	12	7	.632
St. Louis Browns	1884	1889	465	214	.685
Chicago Pirates	1890	1890	75	62	.547
St. Louis Browns	1891	1891	86	52	.623
Cincinnati Reds	1892	1894	202	206	.495
Total			840	541	.608
Ref.:

== See also ==
- List of Major League Baseball career stolen bases leaders
- List of Major League Baseball player-managers
- List of St. Louis Cardinals team records
