= J. Louis Comiskey =

American businessman and baseball executive

John Louis Comiskey
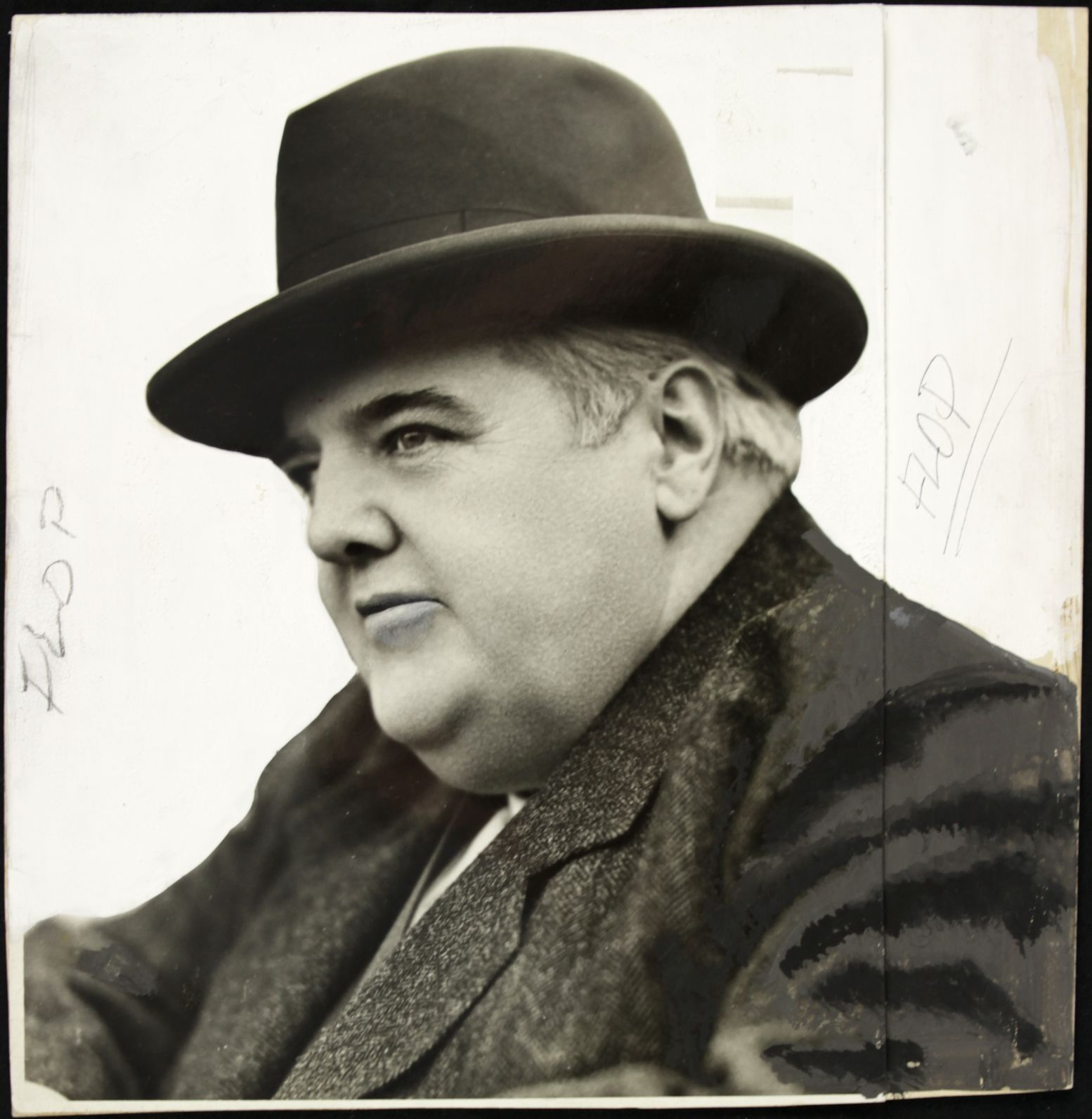

Owner of the Chicago White Sox
- In office 1931–1939
- Preceded by: Charles Comiskey
- Succeeded by: Grace Comiskey

Personal details
- Born: August 12, 1885
- Died: July 18, 1939 (aged 53) Eagle River, Wisconsin

John Louis Comiskey (August 12, 1885 – July 18, 1939) was an American businessman and the owner of the Chicago White Sox of the American League from 1931 to 1939.

== Biography ==
He was born on August 12, 1885, son of Charles Comiskey. He inherited the team from his father in 1931. He started work for the White Sox in 1910.

Comiskey died at his summer home in Eagle River, Wisconsin on July 18, 1939 after an illness related to the heart disease he had suffered from. His body was placed on a train at Eagle River and taken to Chicago, where it would lie in state. The game between the White Sox and the New York Yankees on July 22 would be postponed for the owner's burial. Control of the White Sox passed to Comiskey's widow, Grace Comiskey, upon his death due to his son Chuck Comiskey not being of age to operate the team according to his father's will.
