= Rate Field =

Baseball park in Chicago, Illinois

- White Sox Park; Sox Park; New Comiskey; The Cell

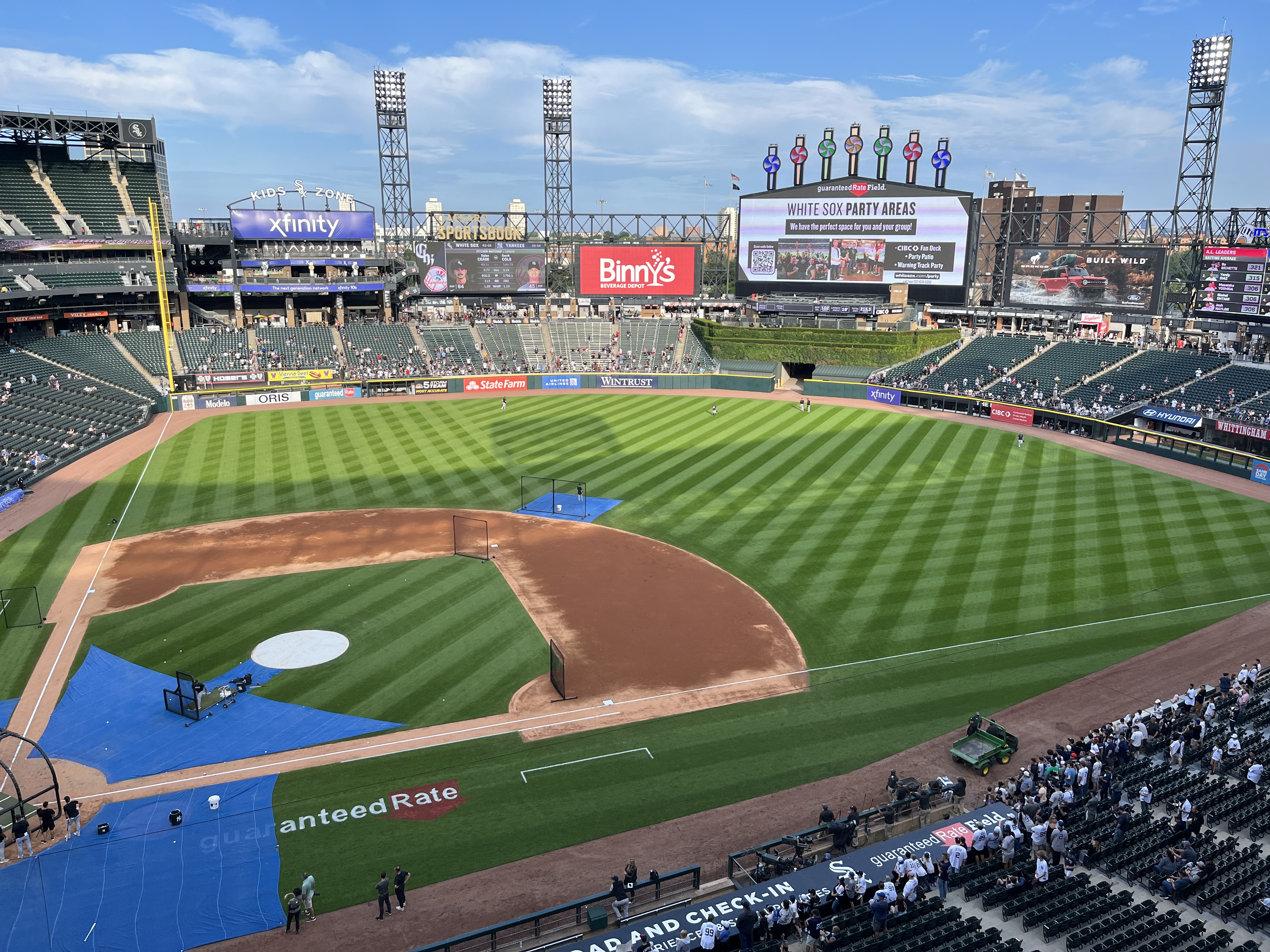
- Rate Field in 2023

- Location in Chicago Location in Illinois Location in the United States
- Former names: Comiskey Park II (1991–2003); U.S. Cellular Field (2003–2016); Guaranteed Rate Field (2017–2024)
- Address: 333 West 35th Street
- Location: Chicago, Illinois, U.S.
- Coordinates: 41°49′48″N 87°38′2″W
- Owner: Illinois Sports Facilities Authority
- Operator: Illinois Sports Facilities Authority
- Capacity: 40,615 (2004–present); 47,098 (2002–2003); 47,522 (2001); 44,321 (1991–2000)
- Surface: Kentucky Bluegrass
- Scoreboard: 8,000 square foot Center field HD video board 60 feet (18 m) × 134 feet (41 m) (2016–present); 2,500 square foot auxiliary video boards in Right & Left Field (2016–present); LED Ribbon Board, facade of the 500 level (2018–present); Fan Deck Ribbon Board (2003–present)
- Record attendance: 47,754 (September 24, 2016; Chance the Rapper concert); White Sox game: 46,246 (October 5, 1993; ALCS Game 1); Post-renovations: 41,432 (October 23, 2005; World Series Game 2)
- Field size: (2001–present); Left field – 330 ft (100 m); Left-center – 375 ft (114 m) (not posted); Center field – 400 ft (120 m); Right-center – 375 ft (114 m) (not posted); Right field – 335 ft (102 m); Backstop – 60 ft (18 m); Outfield wall height – 8 ft (2.4 m)
- Public transit: Red at Sox–35th; Green at 35th–Bronzeville–IIT; RI at 35th Street-Lou Jones
- Parking: 8 main parking lots

Construction
- Groundbreaking: May 7, 1989
- Built: 1989–1990
- Opened: April 18, 1991
- Renovated: 2001–2012, 2015–2019
- Cost: US$137 million ($324 million in 2025 dollars) US$118 million (2001–2007 renovations) ($183 million in 2025 dollars)
- Architects: HOK Sport; HKS, Inc. (2001–2007 renovations)
- Project managers: International Facilities Group, LLC
- Structural engineer: Thornton Tomasetti
- Services engineer: Flack + Kurtz
- General contractor: Gust K. Newberg Construction Company

Tenant
- Chicago White Sox (MLB) (1991–present)

Website
- mlb.com/whitesox/ballpark

Rate Field (formerly Comiskey Park II, U.S. Cellular Field, and Guaranteed Rate Field) is a baseball stadium on the South Side of Chicago, Illinois. It is the home ballpark of the Chicago White Sox, one of the city's two Major League Baseball teams, and is owned by the state of Illinois through the Illinois Sports Facilities Authority. Built for $137 million, the park opened as Comiskey Park on April 18, 1991, taking its name from the original Comiskey Park, the team's home since 1910.

Rate Field sits just west of the Dan Ryan Expressway in Chicago's Armour Square neighborhood, next to the more famous neighborhood of Bridgeport. The stadium was built across 35th Street from the original Comiskey Park, which was demolished to make room for a parking lot. The location of Old Comiskey's home plate is indicated by a marble plaque on the sidewalk next to Rate Field, with the foul lines painted in the parking lot. The east-northeasterly spectator ramp across 35th Street was designed to echo the contour of the old first-base grandstand.

== History ==
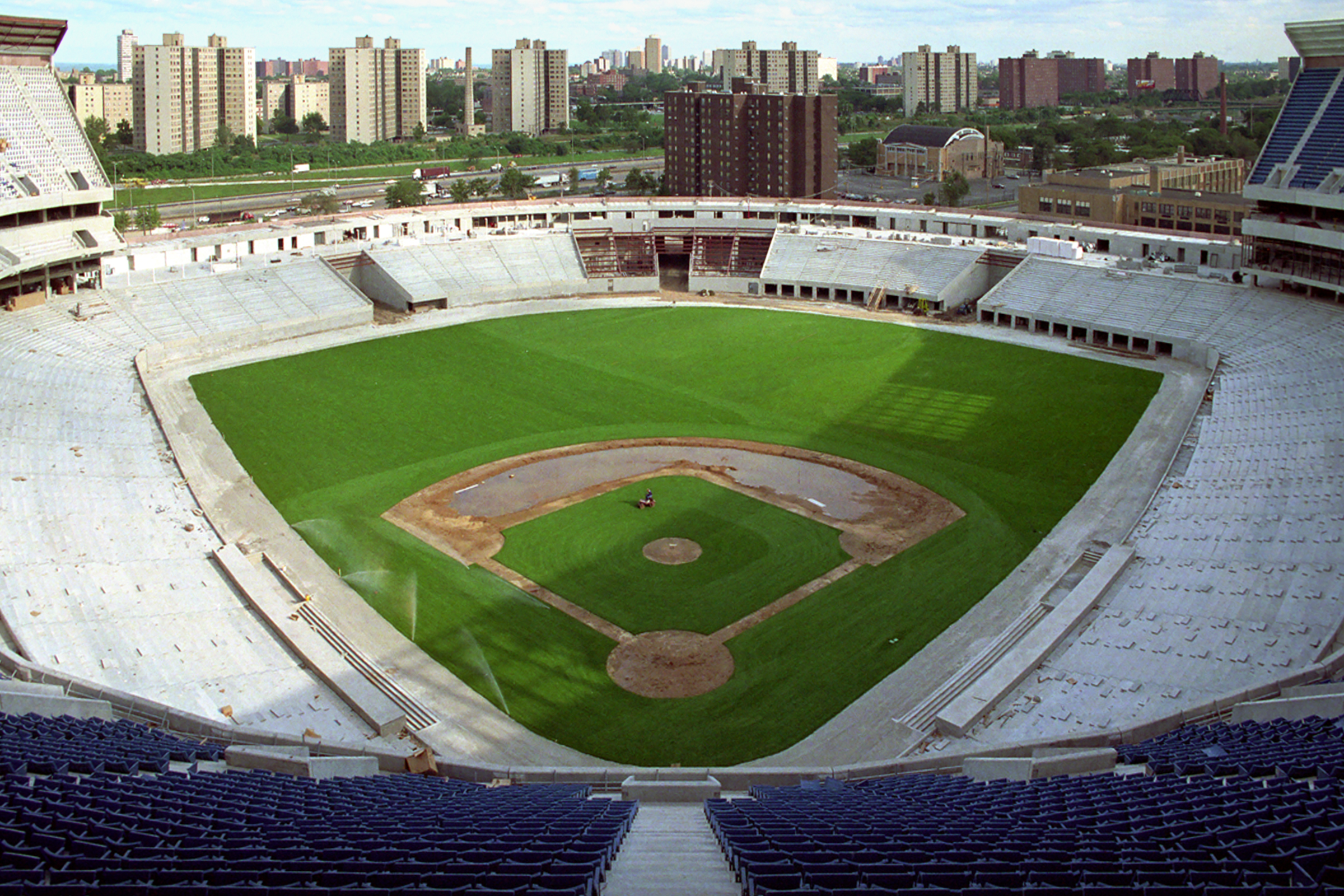
View from the upper deck during construction, September 1990

The stadium was the first major sporting facility built in Chicago since Chicago Stadium in 1929. It was the last MLB park built before the wave of new "retro-classic" ballparks in the 1990s and 2000s.

A few of the old Comiskey Park's design features were retained. The front facade has arched windows. The "exploding scoreboard" pays homage to the original, installed by Bill Veeck at the old park in 1960. The original field dimensions and seating configuration were similar to those of Royals Stadium (now Kauffman Stadium) in Kansas City, which had been the previous baseball-only park built in the majors, in 1973.

Opened on April 18, 1991, the park was initially criticized by many fans because of the height of the upper deck. The original architect, HOK Sport (now Populous), sought to eliminate the overhang problems present in many stadiums built since the 1970s by setting the upper deck back over the lower deck, with the stands rising fairly gradually. This gave nearly every seat in the upper level an unobstructed view of the field, but also created one of the highest upper decks in baseball. The first row of seats in the upper deck is as far from the field as the old stadium's highest row of seats. Fans sitting in this area did not get much chance for relief, as it was one of the few MLB parks that did not allow fans sitting in the upper deck to venture anywhere else in the park, such as the lower deck concourse. Moreover, the upper deck made the park look like a cookie-cutter stadium from the outside.

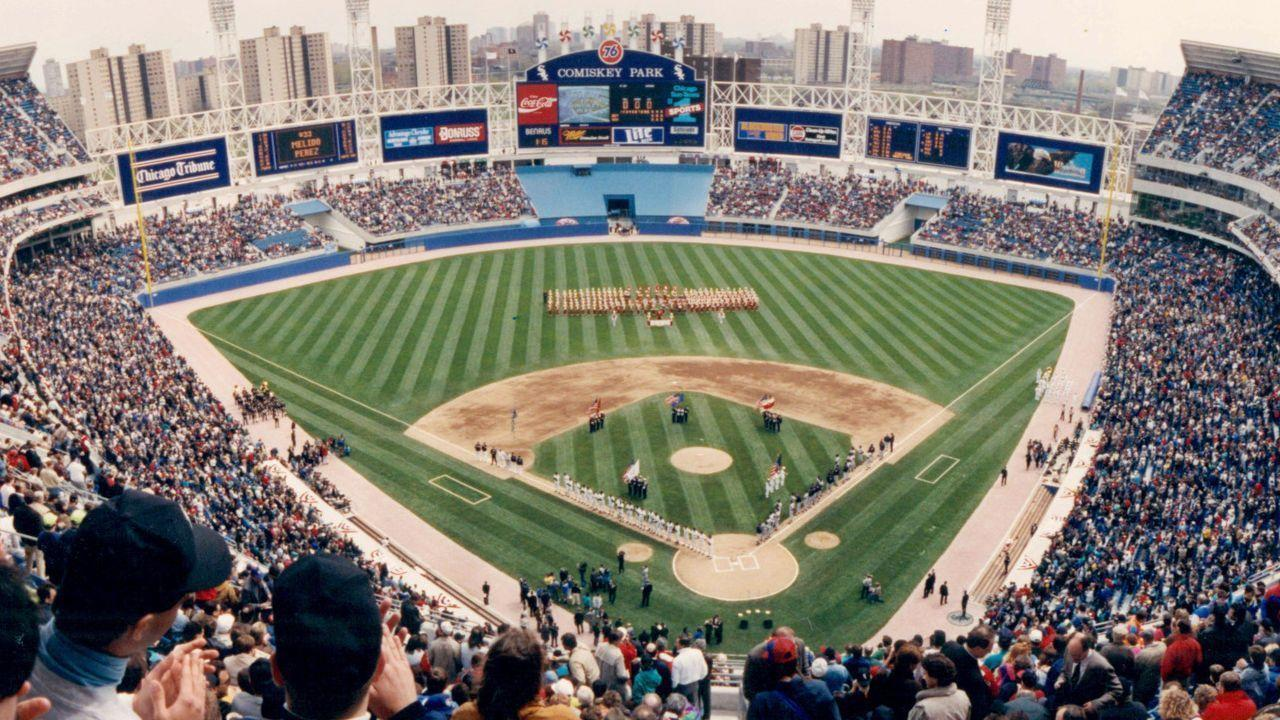
New Comiskey Park on opening day, April 18, 1991

Since 2001, the team has altered the stadium in response to fan complaints: it added a multi-tiered concourse beyond center field, adjusted the fences to make the outfield less symmetrical, and, most significantly, removed 6,600 seats at the top of the upper deck.

The park's uppermost tier now has a white-and-black screen behind the top row of seats and is topped by a flat canopy roof supported by black steel-truss supports that obstruct the view from a few seats. The original blue seats were also replaced by forest-green seats. The new green-and-black color scheme, upper-level screen set back from the outer wall, and canopy roof are reminiscent of the old Comiskey Park and other classic stadiums. Murals, a prominent feature of the old stadium, were also added to the interior concourses.

=== Naming rights ===
Originally called Comiskey Park, the stadium was renamed U.S. Cellular Field in 2003, after Chicago-based telecommunications company U.S. Cellular purchased the naming rights for 20 years for $68 million. U.S. Cellular later paid $13 million to end the agreement seven years early, saving an estimated $10.8 million.

The stadium's next name, Guaranteed Rate Field, was announced on October 31, 2016, after the Chicago-based private residential mortgage company Guaranteed Rate bought the naming rights in a 13-year deal. It was later revealed that Guaranteed Rate would pay $20.4 million over ten years for the 13-year agreement, an average payment of $2.04 million, less than U.S. Cellular's yearly payment of $3.4 million and below the average MLB naming rights payment of $3.6 million at the time of the deal's signing. In December 2024, the stadium's name was shortened to "Rate Field" after Guaranteed Rate rebranded.

== Features ==
The stadium has 103 luxury suites on two levels; the desire for these lucrative suites was one reason old Comiskey Park was replaced. It has 1,822 "club seats" on the 300-level mezzanine between the lower deck and upper deck. Patrons in the club seats are served by waitstaff and may visit an enclosed concourse with television viewing areas and bar-style concessions.

The stadium has 400 wheelchair-accessible seats, 38 public restrooms, 12 escalators, and 15 elevators.

The park also has several statues in the outfield concourse honoring former White Sox players Minnie Miñoso, Carlton Fisk, Luis Aparicio, Nellie Fox, Billy Pierce, Harold Baines, Frank Thomas, Paul Konerko, and Mark Buehrle, as well as Charles Comiskey.

The Jim Thome Plaque on the center field fan deck reads: "On June 4, 2008, Chicago White Sox slugger Jim Thome became the first player ever to hit a baseball onto the Fan Deck of U.S. Cellular Field as the Sox beat the Kansas City Royals. He duplicated the tape-measure feat on September 30, 2008 as the White Sox beat the Minnesota Twins, 1–0, in a one-game playoff to win the American League Central Division championship."

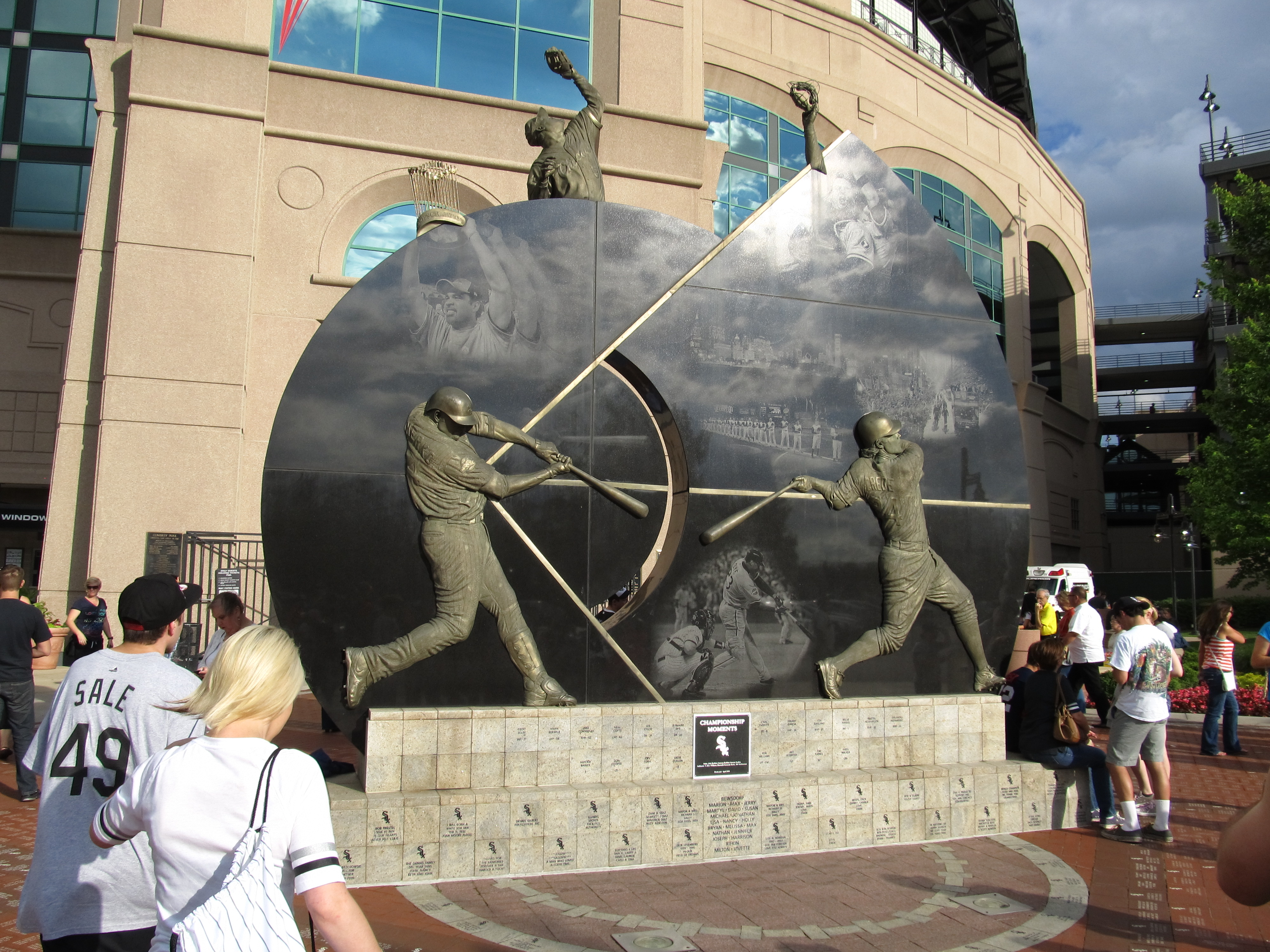
Champions Plaza

White Sox Champions Brick Plaza, located at the main entrance (Gate 4), is dedicated to the 2005 World Series Champion White Sox and their fans. Each legacy brick is inscribed with a personalized message that has become part of a new baseball diamond-shaped plaza outside the main entrance to the ballpark. A life-sized white bronze and granite sculpture celebrating the 2005 championship stands at the center of the plaza, with a historical timeline of the franchise along the diamond's base paths. The statue weighs over 25 tons.

== Renovations and additions ==
=== 1996–1999 ===
- 1996 – A bullpen bar was added in right field.
- 1998 – The batter's eye was painted from blue to black.
- 1999 – A new Bill Veeck-esque showerhead in left field and a "Rain Room" in right field for fans to cool off during hot summertime games.

=== 2001–2007 ===
In 2001, extensive renovations were started by HKS Sports & Entertainment Group to make the park more fan-friendly:

==== Phase I (2001 season) ====
- Three rows of nearly 2,000 seats were added along the field between the dugouts and the foul poles.
- Bullpens were moved to allow fans to see pitchers warming up; former bullpens filled with new seats.
- Two-tiered terrace seating area added outside the Bullpen Sports Bar.
- Distances to the outfield wall were changed, most noticeably down the foul lines, where the bullpens and the Bullpen Sports Bar are now located.
- Outfield seating area extended to the fence.
- A full-service restaurant dubbed the Stadium Club was introduced with windows overlooking the right field corner.
- Capacity was increased from 44,321 to 45,936.

==== Phase II (2002 season) ====
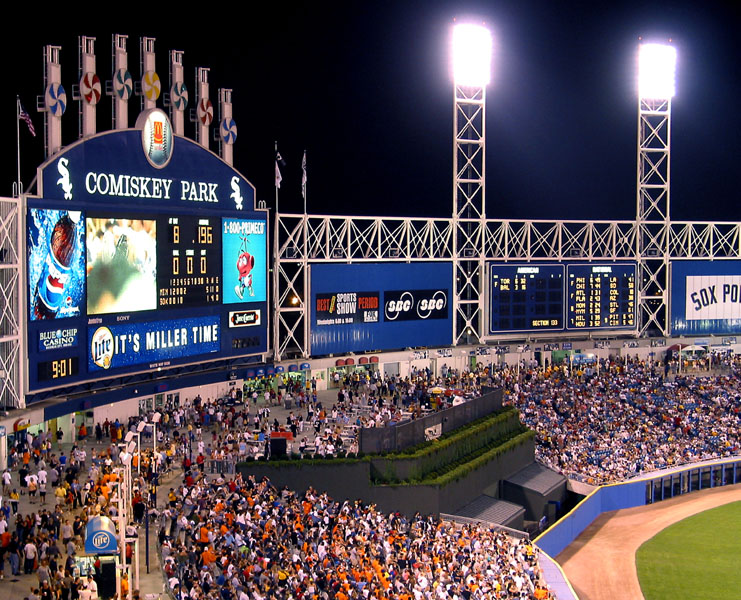
Comiskey Park in 2002 with the new batter's eye

- Old backstop with netted roof was replaced with a new "roofless" backstop which allows foul balls to drop into seats directly behind home plate.
- Multi-tiered batter's eye built in center field.
- Main concourse upgraded with brick facade, stainless steel counter tops and decorative lighting.
- Club-level concourse enclosed and carpeted with heating, air conditioning and comfortable seating areas throughout.
- Party deck was added in center field, just below the scoreboard and above the batter's eye.

==== Phase III (2003 season) ====
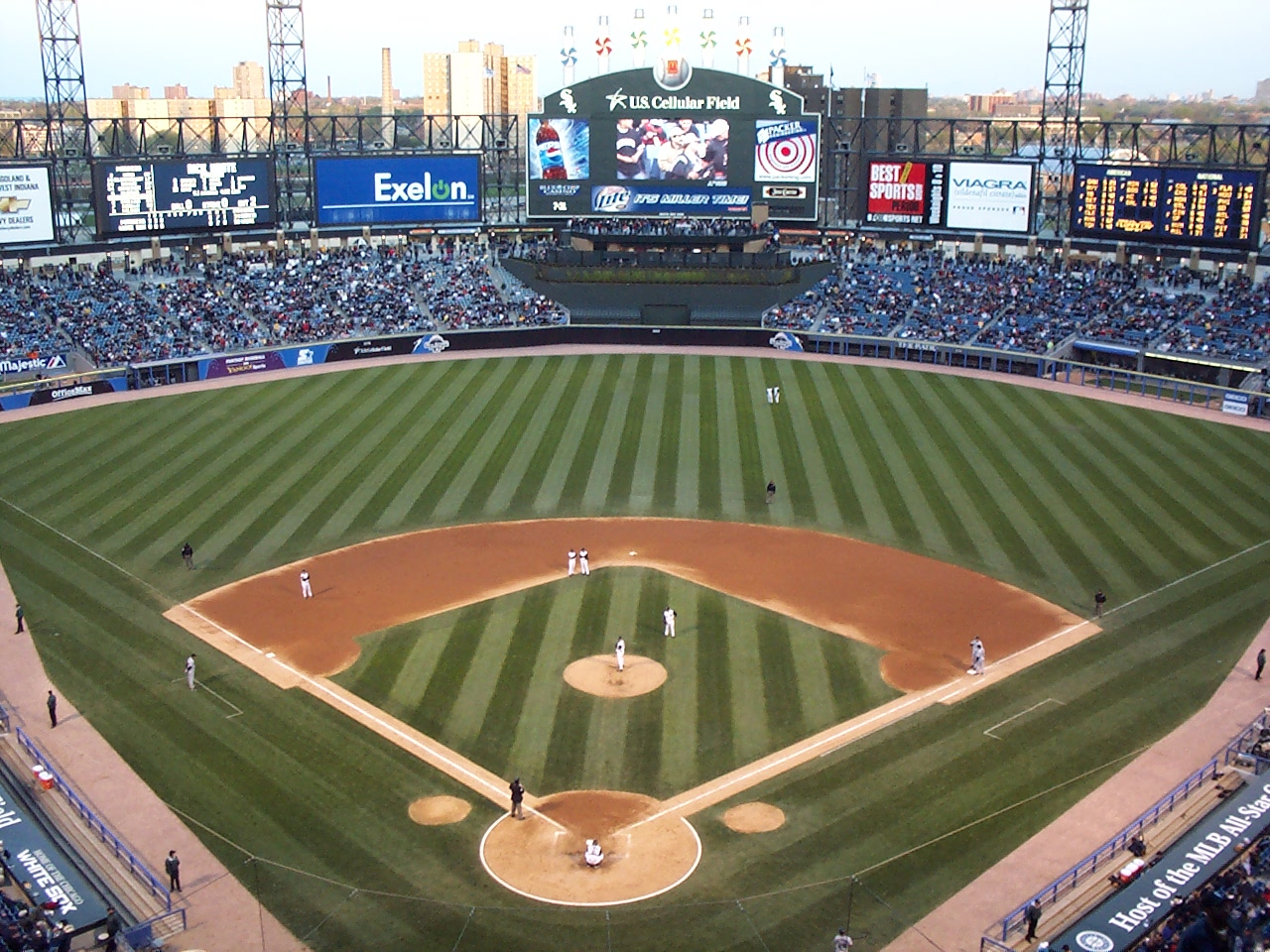
U.S. Cellular Field in 2003 with the new video board and fan deck

- Scoreboard and video boards were upgraded.
- Full-color, high resolution 28 × 53-foot (16 m) video screen added to center field scoreboard.
- Two 300-foot (91 m)-long, 5-foot (1.5 m)-high video LED "ribbon" boards added along the upper deck facade.
- Design upgrades consistent with the lower deck finished on outfield and upper deck concourses.
- Fan Deck, featuring food and beverage service in an elevated patio-like atmosphere, built on center field concourse.
- Outfield steel framework and underside of canopy roof painted dark gray; concrete in seating areas and on pedestrian ramps stained gray.
- A life size bronze statue of Charles Comiskey was placed on the center field concourse behind section 100.
- Capacity is increased from 45,936 to 47,098.
- Phase III renovations cost approximately $20 million.

==== Phase IV (2004 season) ====
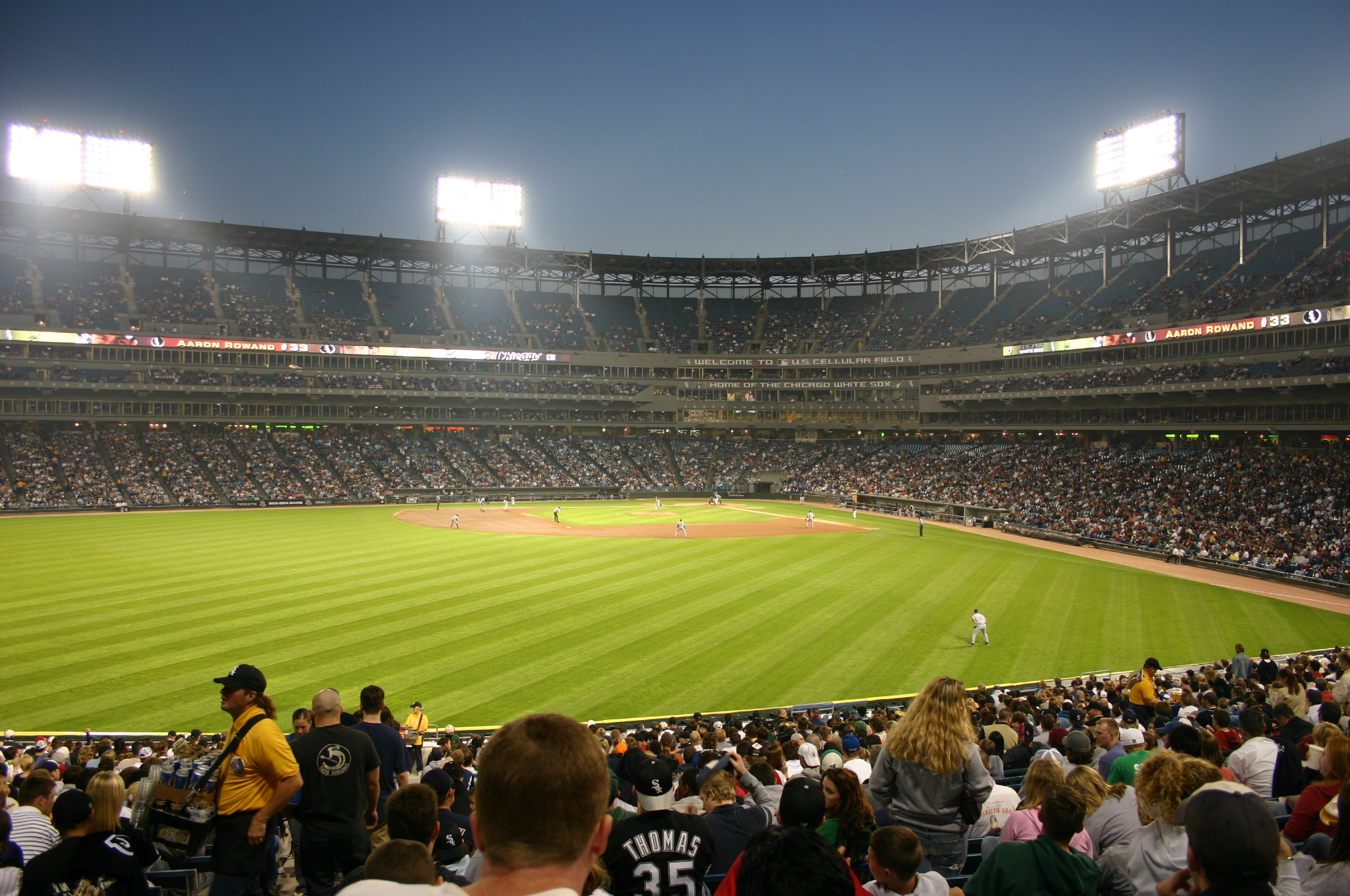
U.S. Cellular Field in 2004 with the new roof and lighting

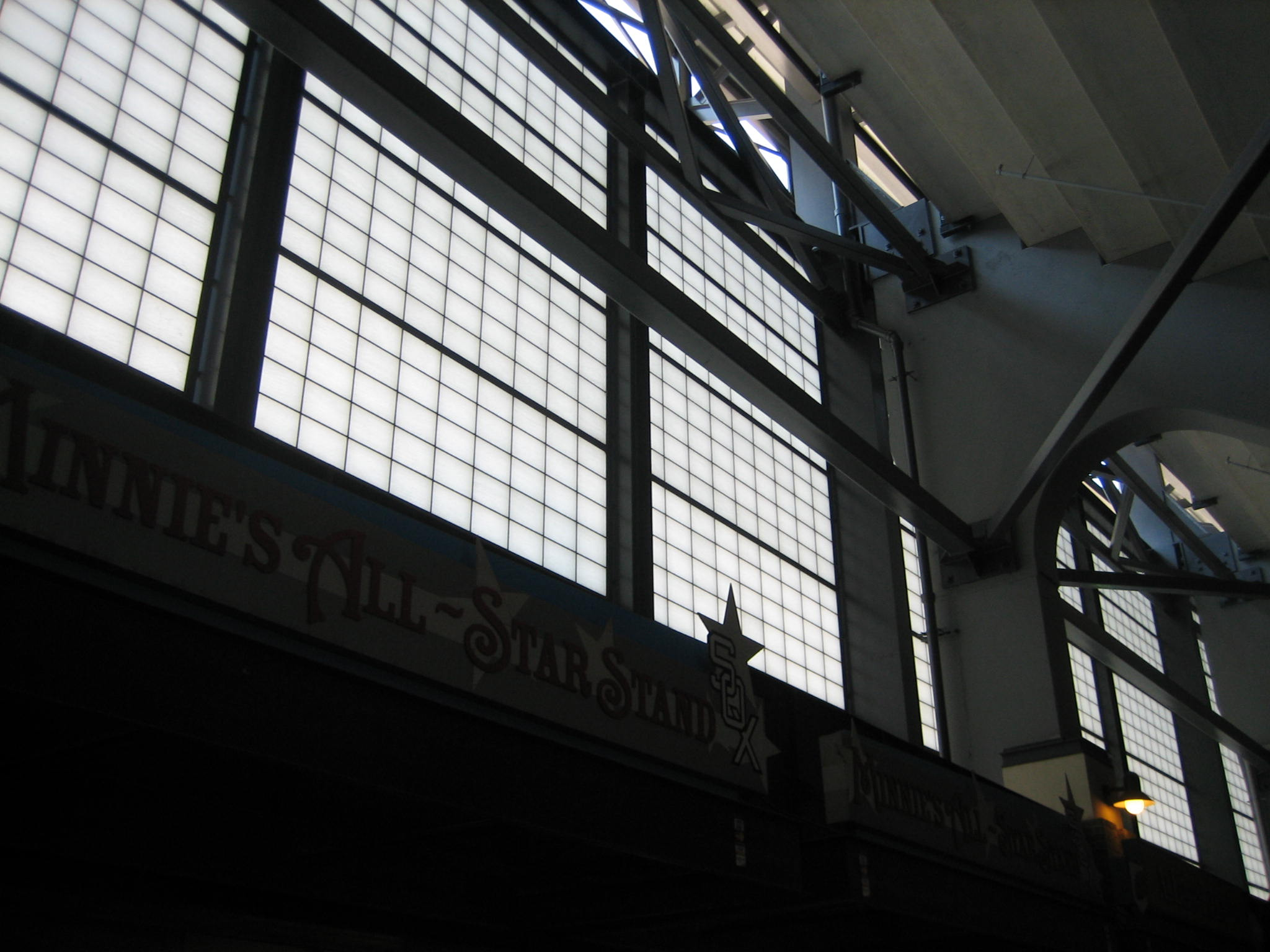
A translucent wall in the upper deck was added in 2004 to block the elements.

- Upper Deck Seating Area – Eight rows and 6,600 seats were removed from the top of the ballpark's upper deck.
- A flat roof, elevated 20 feet (6.1 m) above the seating area, has replaced the old sloped canopy-style roof, covering 13 of the 21 rows of seating.
- Upper Deck Concourse was partially enclosed from the weather by a translucent wall.
- Fan Deck in center field upgraded to feature tiered seating and standing room.
- Lower Terrace balcony added to provide an additional party area and outdoor seating.
- The outfield wall was redone with pictures of White Sox players who've had their number retired.
- A life sized bronze statue of Minnie Miñoso placed on the center field concourse behind section 164.
- Capacity is decreased from 47,098 to 40,615.
- Phase IV renovations cost approximately $28 million.

==== Phase V (2005 season) ====
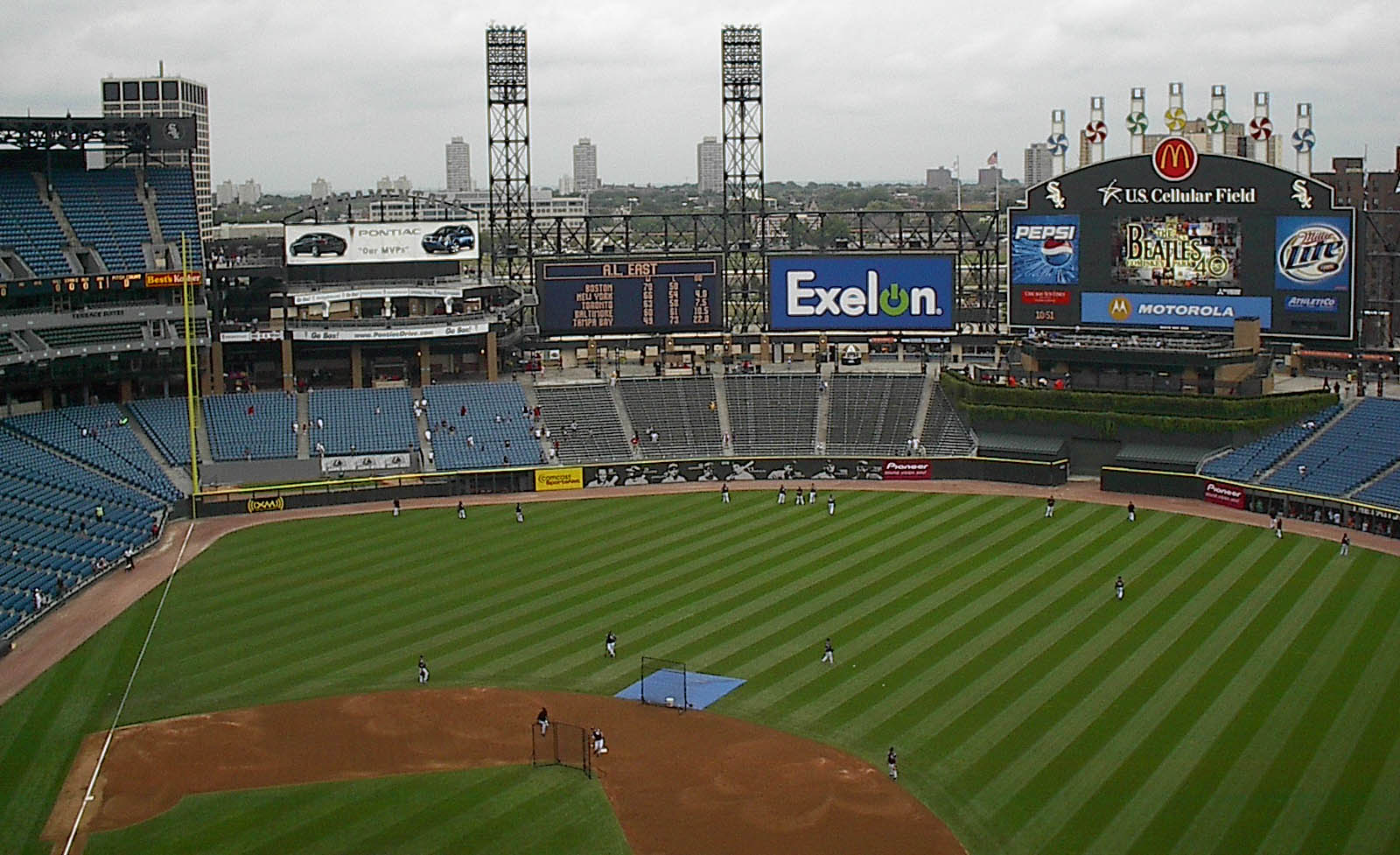
U.S. Cellular Field in 2005, with the new Fundamentals Deck in left field

- 314-seat "Scout" seating area directly behind home plate added.
- FUNdamentals Deck, an area for kids to work on various baseball skills, was added above the left field concourse.
- Green seats, modeled after those in the original Comiskey Park, replaced the old blue seats in the Club level and some scattered areas around home plate. The bleachers in left-center field were painted green.
- A bronze statue of Carlton Fisk was placed on the center field concourse behind section 164 on August 7.

==== Phase VI (2006 season) ====
- Green seats reminiscent of those in the original Comiskey Park replaced the old blue seats in the entire Upper Deck and the Lower Deck between the dugouts.
- Enclosed, ground level restaurant was completed, providing a lounge and dining area for the Scout Seats.
- New banners were hung down on the outfield light towers. One for the 2005 World Series, one for the 1906 and 1917 World Series, one for all White Sox American League pennants, and one for all the division championships.
- The flags for these titles, now on the banners, were replaced with flags of all the Sox logos in club history.
- Bronze statues of Nellie Fox and Luis Aparicio were placed on the center field concourse behind section 100.

==== Phase VII (2007 season) ====
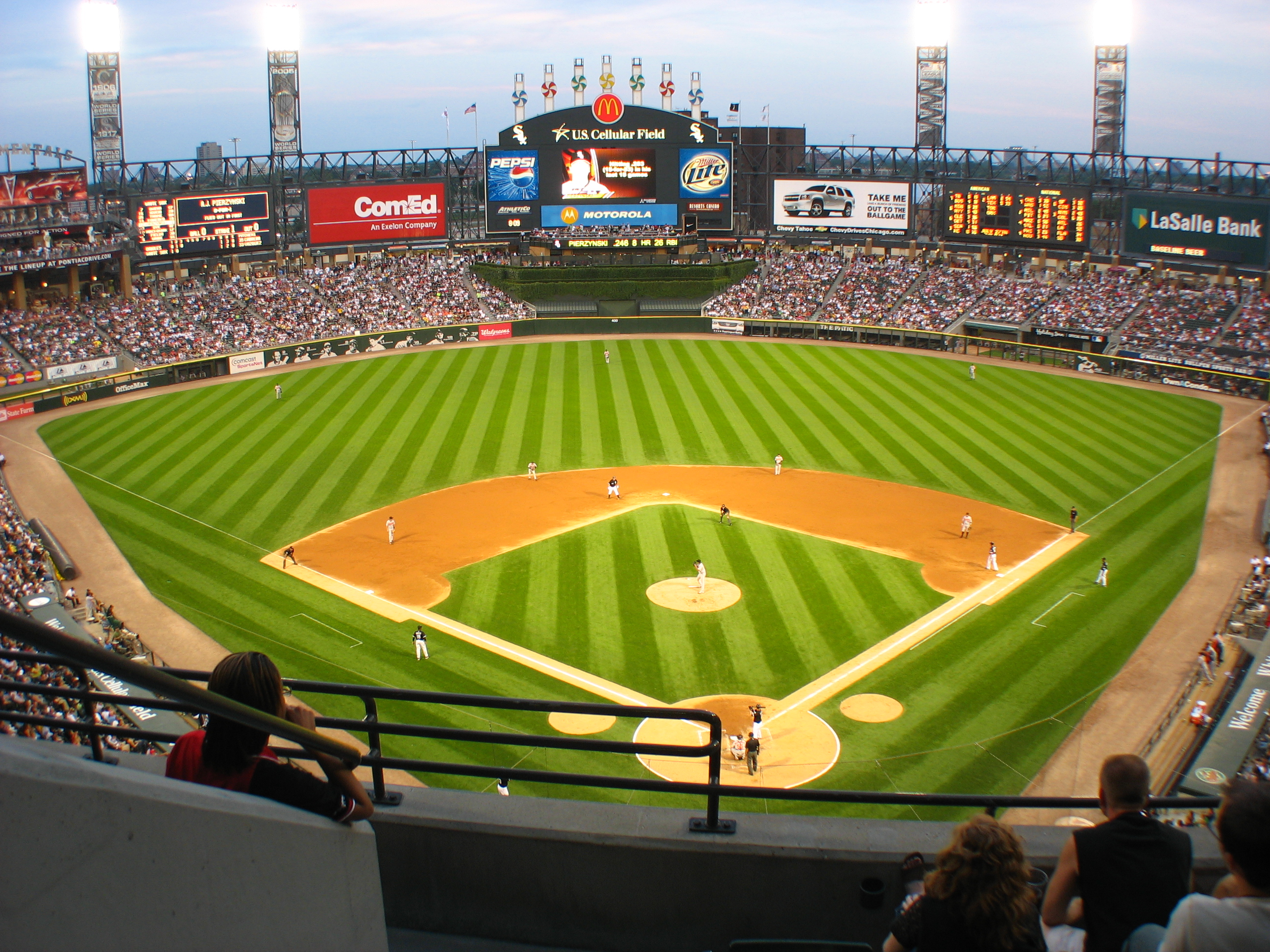
U.S. Cellular Field in 2007

- Green seats replaced the old blue seats in the Lower Deck from the dugouts and the entire outfield seating area (including the left-center field bleachers which were previously renovated). The green seats between the dugout and the foul poles have been slightly turned, re-directing them toward the center of the field. (Visually Re-Directed Seats)
- The seats where Paul Konerko's Grand Slam (left field) and Scott Podsednik's walk off home run (right center first row) landed in game two of the 2005 World Series are the same original blue seats in use at that game and stand out from the all-green seats.
- The Scoreboard in right field was painted green.
- A new premium seating/restaurant named the Jim Beam Club (known as the Home Plate Club as of 2014) was added in the former press box behind home plate on the stadium's Diamond Suites 200 Level.
- A new press box was added on the first base side on the Diamond Suites 400 Level. The facility features 32 flat-screen televisions, wireless internet access and seating for 100 working members of the media.
- A new custom T-shirt shop was added.
- A bronze statue of Billy Pierce was placed on the center field concourse behind section 164 on July 23.
- A Thome Ticker counting down to Jim Thome's 500th career home run (hit on September 16 against the Los Angeles Angels of Anaheim). The ticker was located in right field on the right advertising board, and was taken down after the 2007 season.
- The beginning of the White Sox Champions brick plaza in front of the stadium (Gate 4) and Phase I of brick sales.

=== Extensive renovations (2008–present) ===
Renovations were added that were not part of the original plan:

==== 2008 season ====
- The Illinois Sports Facilities Authority unveiled the first environmentally friendly permeable paving parking lot to be used by a Major League sports facility on April 8. The new lot (Lot L) saves taxpayer money by substantially reducing the amount of water entering Chicago's stormwater system, improving overall water quality and help reduce the Urban heat island effect.
- The White Sox Legacy Brick Program unveiled its brick plaza outside Gate 4 on April 11. Each Legacy Brick is inscribed with a personalized message and has become part of a new baseball diamond-shaped plaza outside the main entrance to the ballpark. A white, bronze and granite sculpture weighing over 25 tons that celebrates the 2005 White Sox World Series championship stands at the center of the plaza, with a historical timeline of the franchise along the diamond's base paths. Players on the sculpture from the 2005 team are Paul Konerko, Joe Crede, Orlando Hernández, Geoff Blum, and Juan Uribe.
- Plasma flatscreen television sets were added throughout the outfield concourse and at the top of its beer concession stands.
- A bronze statue of Harold Baines was placed on the right field concourse behind Section 105 on July 20.

==== 2009 season ====
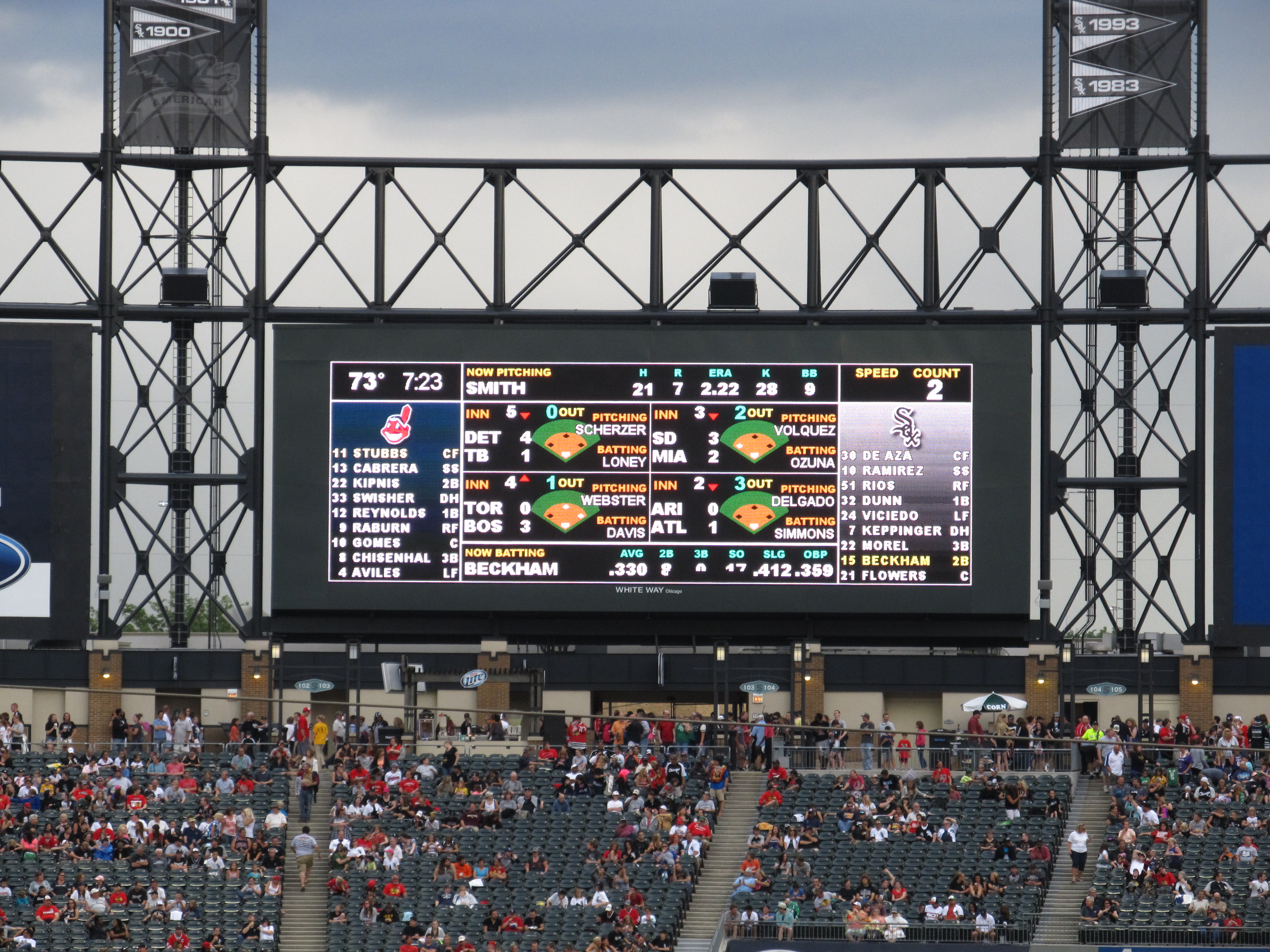
Out-of-town video board (2009–2015)

- About $15 million in renovations were made to Gate 5 (north of 35th Street) to improve access to the park. The demolition (beginning of November 2008) of the easternmost portion of the pedestrian ramp and removal of the top two levels of the easternmost foot bridge across 35th Street, reducing it to one level with continuing access to the park on the main concourse level. The second foot bridge at Gate 5, about 75 yards (69 m) west of the east bridge, continues to offer access to the park on three levels. The project also included installation of escalators in a new, weather-protected enclosure and installation of elevators which provide additional access for fans with disabilities. The project was completed by opening day on April 7, when the White Sox defeated the Kansas City Royals 4–2.
- Inside the park, a new scoreboard (23 ft x 68 ft) with 913,000 LED lights (similar to Tropicana Field) replaced the older out-of-town scoreboard in right field. In addition to displaying both lineups (that of the Sox and their opponents) the board showed season stats for the current batter and pitcher. It also served as an upgrade to the old "around-the-league" scoreboard that it replaced. While the old scoreboard showed only the current innings, scores, and pitchers' jersey numbers, the new board was capable of showing balls, strikes, outs, locations of any baserunners, and the current batter and pitcher by last name instead of by number. A slight disadvantage is that the new board only showed four games at a time in this manner, whereas the old board showed every game in progress simultaneously.
- A small plaque honoring Jim Thome located on the center field fan deck for his 464-foot (141 m) home run shot that landed there, becoming the first player ever to do so on June 4, 2008. The White Sox defeated the Royals in that game. Thome duplicated this feat again on September 30, 2008, in a one-game playoff against AL Central rival Minnesota Twins. His home run proved to be the game winner in a 1–0 shutout to win the AL Central.
- For White Sox players, a new hydrotherapy room with three combinational hot-and-cold whirlpool tubs. An underwater treadmill that can curb problems relating to the abdominals, back and knee and strengthens the muscles and hip, is installed in one of the tubs.
- "The Catch" was written on the left-center field wall above Billy Pierce's image (now above a blank wall), where DeWayne Wise robbed Gabe Kapler of a 9th-inning home run and ensured Mark Buehrle's perfect game on July 23, 2009.

==== 2010–present ====
2010 season

- TBD's, an outdoor beer garden was installed by July 26 at Gate 5, accessible to people 21 and older with or without a game ticket. It lasted just one year. Home Plate Club opened behind home plate.
- Frank Thomas's number and picture were added to the outfield wall when his number was retired.

2011 season

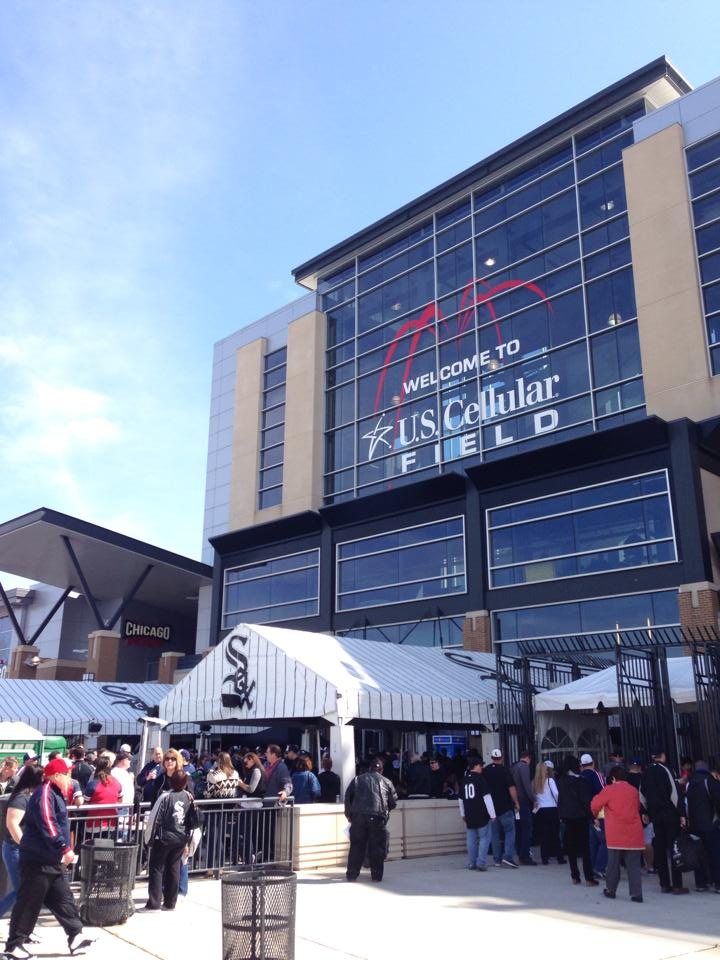
Gate 5 entrance, restaurant and bar

- A new Metra station (Jones/Bronzeville) on the Rock Island line opened east of the ballpark just beyond the I-90/I-94 Dan Ryan Expressway. Designed by Infrastructure Engineering, Inc., built for $7.9 million, it opened a year behind schedule.
- A multi-level restaurant and bar opened inside Gate 5 (Bacardi at the Park, then renamed ChiSox Bar and Grill).
- A bronze statue of Frank Thomas was unveiled on July 31, the eighth statue on the outfield concourse.

2012 season

- Chicago Sports Depot, a merchandise store, opened on November 19, 2011, next to Gate 5 and ChiSox Bar and Grill.

2014 season

- A bronze statue of Paul Konerko was unveiled on September 27. It is the ninth statue to be placed on the outfield concourse.

2016 season

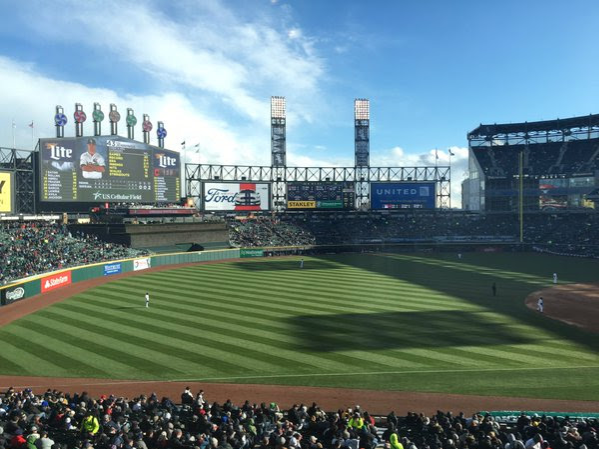
2016 renovations with new HD scoreboards

- Three new HD video boards were installed before the start of the 2016 season at a cost of $7.3 million. The auxiliary boards in left and right field and the main board in center were all replaced by HD screens. The project was funded via the Sox' capital repairs budget.

2018 season

- The visitor's clubhouse was renovated.
- A virtual reality home run derby batting cage was installed in the Chicago Sports Depot.
- A 30-foot (9.1 m) high safety netting was extended to the outfield end of both dugouts, or from section 122 to 142.
- A new LED ribbon board was extended to run the entire length of the grandstand, meaning the retired numbers that resided behind home plate had to be moved to the first and third-base lines.

2019 season

- A 326-seat section dubbed "The Goose Island" (now called "Miller Lite Landing") replaced sections 106 and 107 in right field. The section includes running water fixtures on all four sides to create the "island" of beer and baseball. The section also has individual seating, spaces for group parties, and a standing-room area where fans can interact near the outfield concourse. The first few rows of the section also provide a "modernized" game day experience with cushioned seats, device-charging ports, and TV screens. The revamped section expanded the presence of Goose Island, which is owned by beverage conglomerate Anheuser-Busch InBev. Craft Cave became the Goose Island Craft Cave. Formerly a 10 foot (3.0 m) Goose Island tap statue overlooked the stadium from the special section. The section opened by April 4.
- An extension of the safety netting from the dugouts to foul poles was completed.

2021 season

- The White Sox added the flickering LED lights for when the team comes out of the dugout before the first pitch, hits a home run, wins a game, or when the closer comes out of the bullpen.

2022 season

- The White Sox removed their outfield banners in their light towers.

2023 season

- The White Sox replaced eight rows of seats in Sections 516 and 548 with two viewing bars with walk-up beverage service and seats with good views of the field. The project cost about $284,500.
- The White Sox added turf around the monument of the old Comiskey Park home plate outside the stadium.

2024 season

- The White Sox turned a few far-left suites on the 400 Level into a studio for the Chicago Sports Network.

== Retired numbers ==
There are 13 retired numbers on the facade of the 1st and 3rd base sides of the 300 level.

White Sox retired numbers
No.	Player	Position	White Sox years	Date retired	Notes
2	Nellie Fox	2B	1950–1963	1976	Hall of Fame (1997)
3	Harold Baines	RF, DH; Coach	1980–1989, 1996–97, 2000–01; 2004–2015	1989-08-20	Baines's number was retired after he was traded to the Texas Rangers midway through 1989. The number was unretired for him in 1996 and 2000 when he returned as a player, and in 2004 as an assistant hitting coach. Hall of Fame (2019)
4	Luke Appling	SS	1930–50	1975	Hall of Fame (1964)
9	Minnie Miñoso	LF	1951–57, 1960–61; 1964, 1976, 1980	1983	"Mr. White Sox"; Hall of Fame (2022)
11	Luis Aparicio	SS	1956–1962; 1968–1970	1984-08-14	Hall of Fame (1984)
13	Ozzie Guillén	SS; Manager	1985–1997; 2004–2011	2026-08-08	2005 World Series Champion
14	Paul Konerko	1B	1999–2014	2015-05-23	2005 World Series Champion and ALCS MVP
16	Ted Lyons	P Manager	1923–1946; 1946–1948	1987	Hall of Fame (1955)
19	Billy Pierce	P	1949–61	1987	
35	Frank Thomas	1B, DH	1990–2005	2010-08-29	2005 World Series Champion; Hall of Fame (2014)
56	Mark Buehrle	P	2000–2011	2017-06-24	2005 World Series Champion; Perfect game in 2009
72	Carlton Fisk	C	1981–1993	1997-09-14	Hall of Fame (2000)
42	Jackie Robinson	2B	Brooklyn Dodgers, 1947–1956, Retired by Major League Baseball	1997-04-15	Hall of Fame (1962)

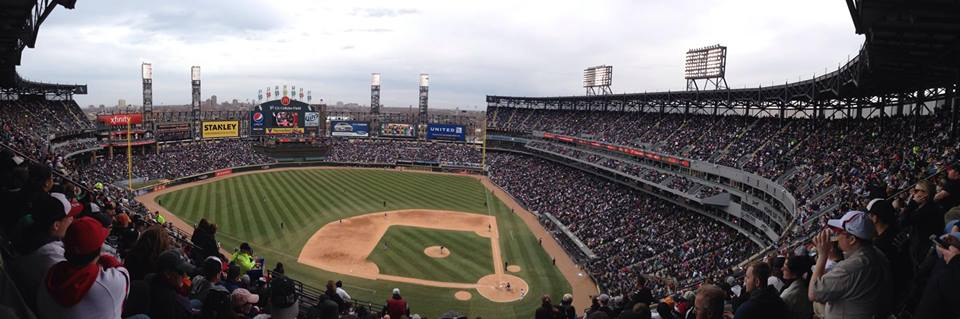
The White Sox taking on the Minnesota Twins on Opening Day 2014

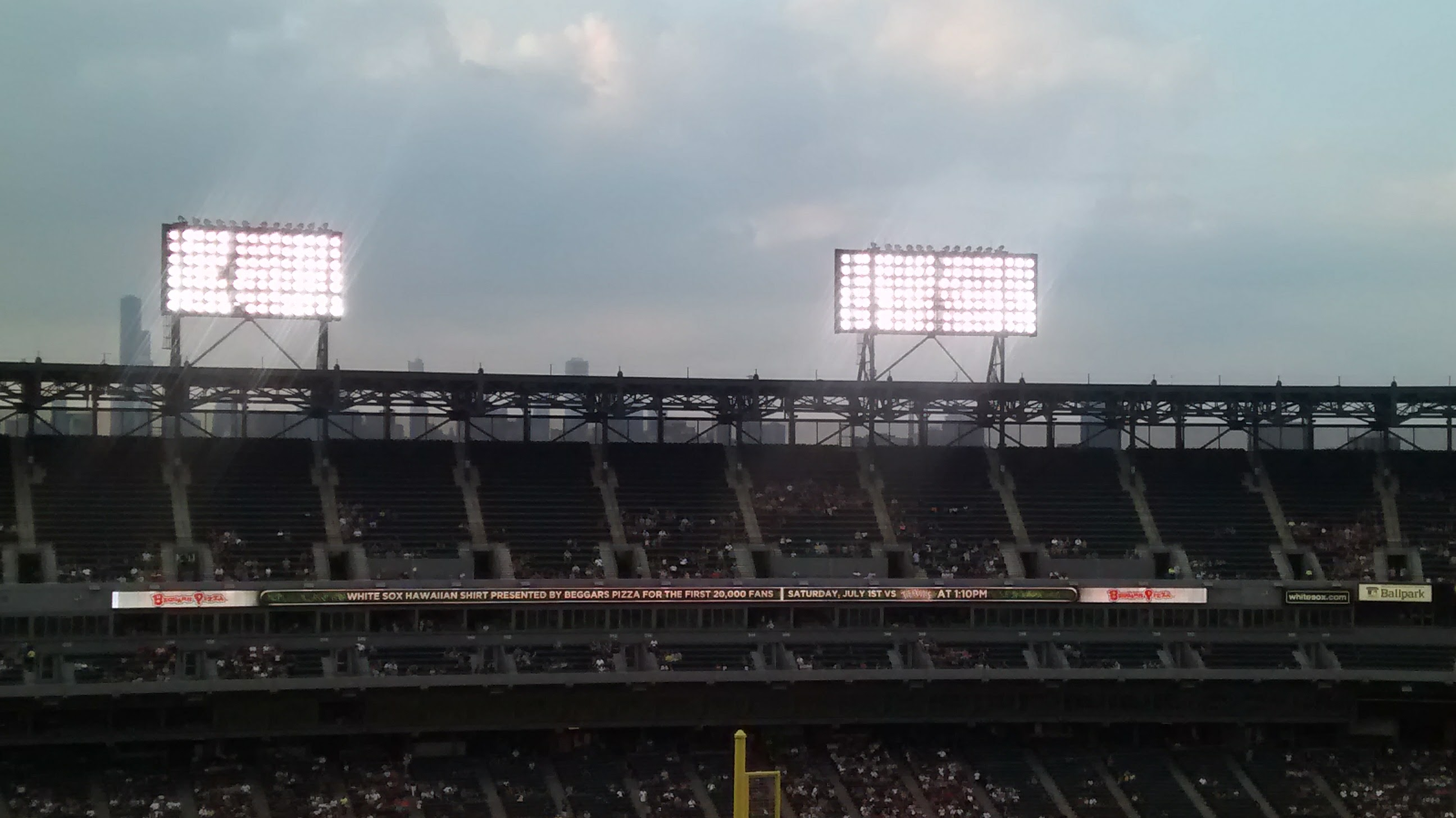
The Chicago skyline overlooking the upper deck behind third base at Rate Field on June 30, 2017

== Ballpark firsts ==
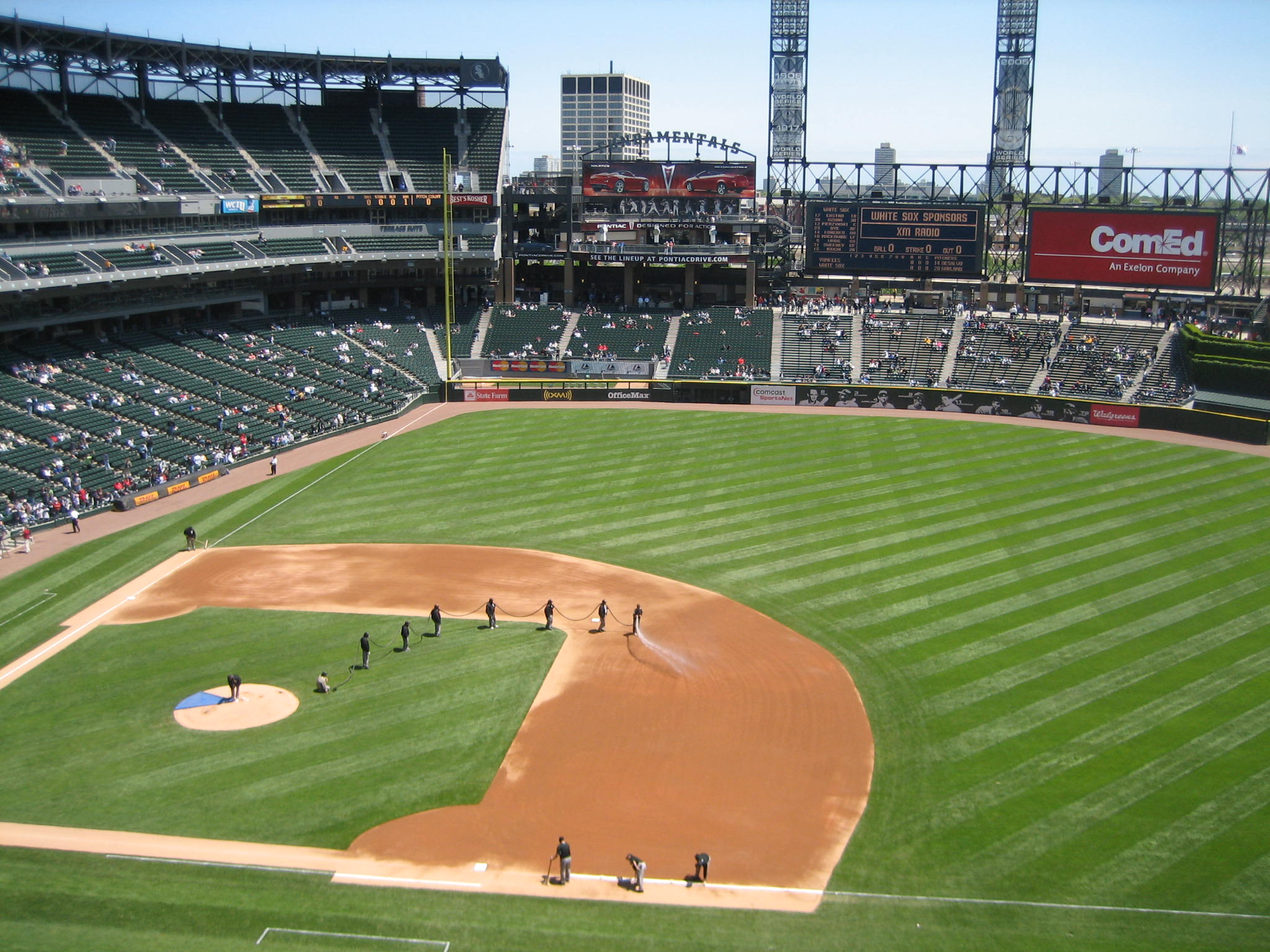
The view from the 500 level

=== Opening Day (April 18, 1991) ===
Statistic	Details
Score	Detroit Tigers 16, White Sox 0
Umpires	Steve Palermo; Mike Reilly; Larry Young; Rich Garcia
Managers	Jeff Torborg, White Sox; Sparky Anderson, Tigers
Starting Pitchers	Jack McDowell, White Sox; Frank Tanana, Tigers
Ceremonial Pitch	Former Illinois Governor Jim Thompson
Attendance	42,191

The view from the White Sox radio booth

=== Batting ===
Statistic	Details
Batter	Tony Phillips (fly out)
White Sox Batter	Tim Raines
Hit	Alan Trammell (single)
Run	Travis Fryman
White Sox Run	Ron Karkovice (April 20, 1991)
RBI	Alan Trammell
White Sox RBI	Dan Pasqua (April 20, 1991)
Single	Alan Trammell
Double	John Shelby
Triple	Tony Phillips
Home run	Cecil Fielder
White Sox Home run	Frank Thomas (April 22, 1991)
Grand slam	Kevin Romine (Boston Red Sox) (May 5, 1991)
IPHR	Marc Newfield (Seattle Mariners) (June 21, 1995)
Stolen base	Lou Whitaker
White Sox Stolen base	Tim Raines
Sacrifice hit	Joey Cora (White Sox) (April 20, 1991)
Sacrifice fly	Matt Merullo (White Sox) (April 27, 1991)
Cycle	Mike Blowers (Oakland Athletics) (May 18, 1998)
White Sox Cycle	Chris Singleton (July 6, 1999)

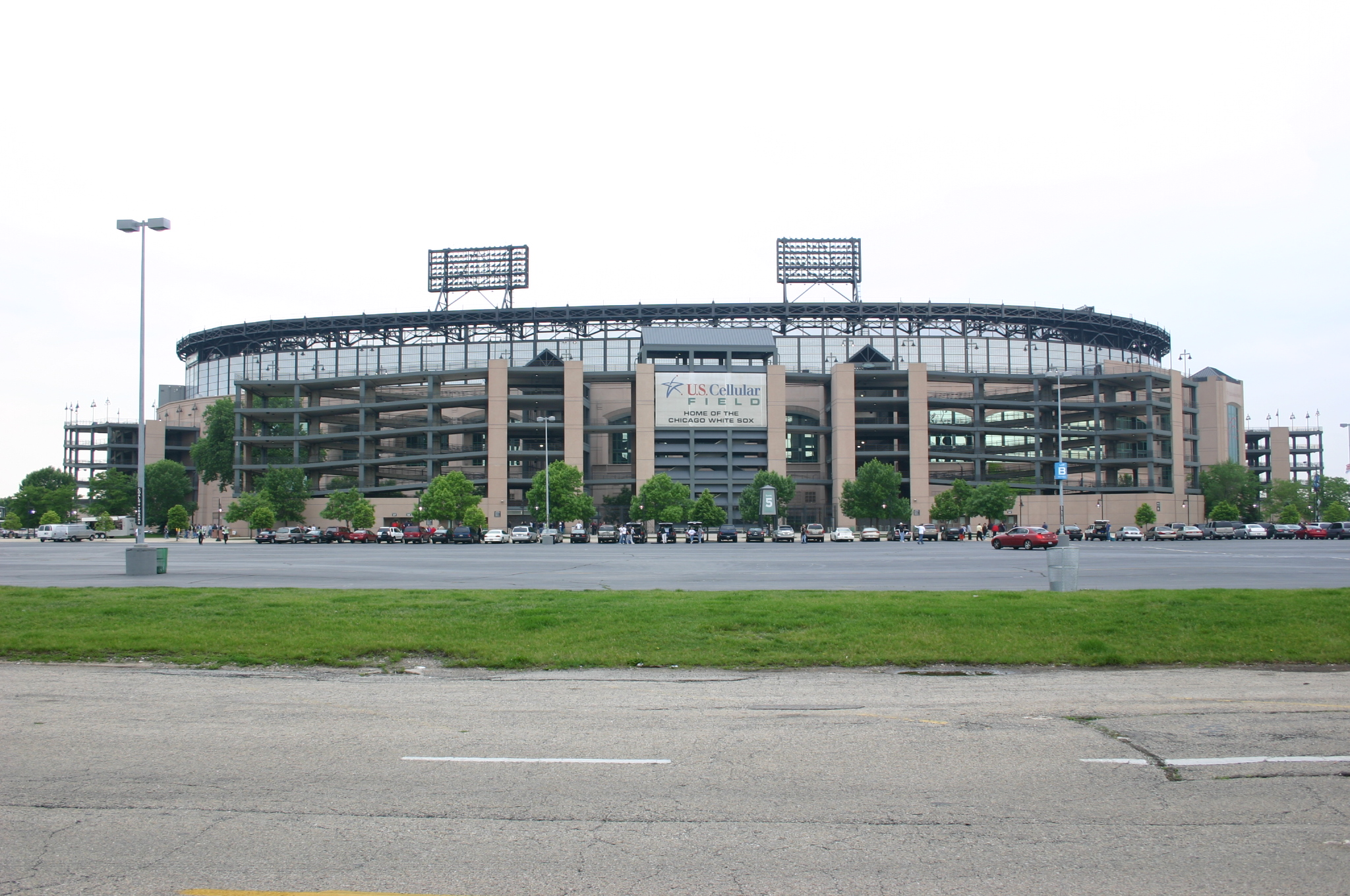
The gate 5 entrance in 2007 before renovations took place for the 2009 season

=== Pitching ===
Statistic	Details
Win	Frank Tanana
White Sox win	Brian Drahman (April 21, 1991)
Loss	Jack McDowell
Visiting loss	Paul Gibson (April 21, 1991)
shutout	Frank Tanana
White Sox Shutout	Jack McDowell (June 25, 1991)
Save	Jerry Don Gleaton (Detroit Tigers) (April 20, 1991)
White Sox save	Bobby Thigpen (April 22, 1991)
Hit by pitch	Dave Johnson (Baltimore Orioles) hit Carlton Fisk (White Sox) (April 23, 1991)
Wild pitch	Mélido Pérez (White Sox) (April 21, 1991)
Balk	Bryan Harvey (California Angels) (May 28, 1991)
No-hitter	Mark Buehrle (White Sox) (April 18, 2007)
Visiting no-hitter	Francisco Liriano (Minnesota Twins) (May 3, 2011)
Perfect game	Mark Buehrle (White Sox) (July 23, 2009)
Immaculate inning	Michael Kopech (White Sox) (July 10, 2024)

=== Other firsts ===
Statistic	Date/Details
Doubleheader	October 3, 1991, vs. Minnesota Twins
Error	Robin Ventura
Use as a neutral site	September 13–14, 2004 – Florida Marlins vs. Montreal Expos. Counted as home games for the Marlins, these games were moved to Chicago due to Hurricane Ivan in Florida. The Marlins were already in Chicago at the time, having just played a series with the Chicago Cubs.
First White Sox Foul Ball hit	April 18, 1991, by Sammy Sosa
First Postseason game	October 5, 1993 vs. Toronto Blue Jays. Blue Jays won 7–3.

== Transportation ==
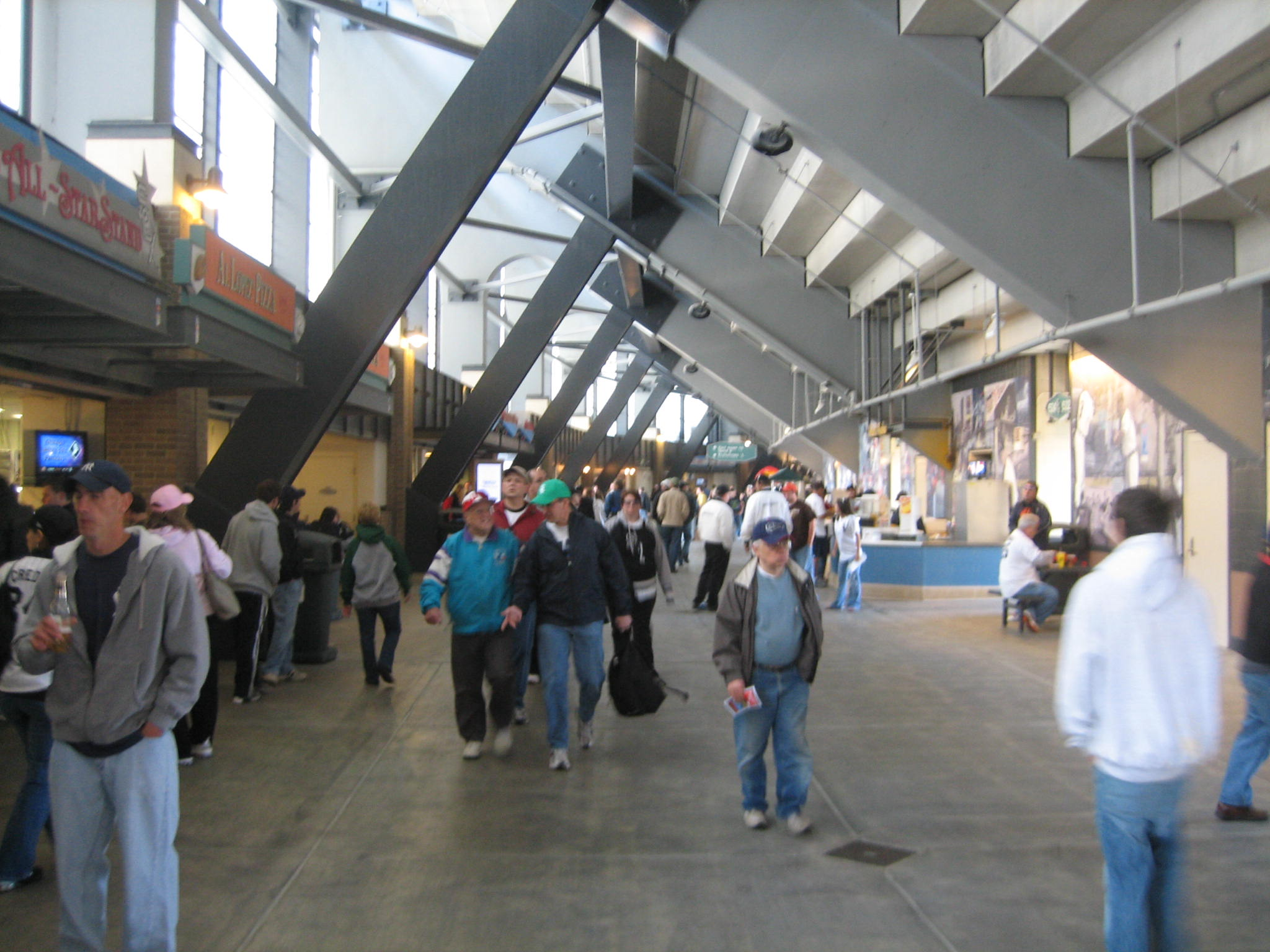
The upper deck concourse

Rate Field can be reached by using the Chicago "L" rapid transit system. The stadium's station stops are Sox–35th for the Red Line and 35-Bronzeville-IIT for the Green Line. Cubs fans also use the Red Line to reach Wrigley Field (Addison Station) on Chicago's north side. (When the White Sox take on the Cubs every year, usually in June, many fans use the Red Line to get to the games. The series is dubbed the Crosstown Classic.)

A new Metra station (35th Street), which helps fans with more accessibility, opened on the Rock Island line in 2011. It is also accessible by CTA bus route #35 (31st/35th Street) and the suburban Pace Rate Field Express shuttle service.

Rate Field is just west of the I-90/94 Dan Ryan Expressway. The ballpark has eight main parking lots.

The main level is accessible only to fans who have a ticket to a seat in the lower level.

== Notable games/events ==
=== 1990s ===
- April 18, 1991: The inaugural game of the ballpark. The White Sox were defeated by the Detroit Tigers 16–0. Attendance: 42,191
- April 22, 1991: Frank Thomas hits the first White Sox home run in new Comiskey Park as the Sox defeat the Baltimore Orioles, 8–7, in the first night contest in the new ballpark. Attendance: (30,480)
- September 27, 1993: White Sox clinch the American League West Division with a 4–2 victory against the Seattle Mariners giving them their first postseason berth since 1983. Attendance: (42,116)
- October 5, 1993: New Comiskey hosted its first ever playoff game, game 1 of the 1993 ALCS. The Sox lost to the Toronto Blue Jays, 7–3. The park also played host to games 2 and 6 of the series, which the Sox lost, four games to two. Attendance: (46,246)
- July 15, 1994: Cleveland Indians player Albert Belle was caught using a corked bat and was confiscated and locked in the umpires' dressing room. During the game, the Indians sent relief pitcher Jason Grimsley to retrieve the bat where Grimsley crawled from inside the false ceiling with a flashlight in his mouth, took the bat, and replaced it with a bat used by Paul Sorrento. By the 6th inning, a custodian noticed the bat was missing with ceiling tiles on the floor. After the game, umpire Dave Phillips noticed the bat was stolen and contacted the Chicago police. The White Sox even threatened to press charges against whoever stole the bat. The AL ordered the Indians to return Belle's bat, threatening to send the FBI before they dropped it and asked for the bat, which the Indians gave back. The bat was sawed and found to be corked and Belle was suspended for 10 games, reduced to 7 on appeal. No one knew who stole the bat until 1999 when Grimsley admitted his participation. Attendance: (38,686)
- September 14, 1997: Carlton Fisk's number 72 was retired by the White Sox as the Sox played the Cleveland Indians. The Sox lost 8–3. Attendance: (32,485)
- May 18, 1998: Oakland Athletics Mike Blowers hits for the cycle against the White Sox in the A's 14–0 win. Blowers becomes the first player to hit for the cycle in the stadium and the second in franchise history to hit for the cycle. Attendance: (14,387)
- July 6, 1999: White Sox Chris Singleton hits for the cycle against the Kansas City Royals. Singleton becomes the first White Sox player to hit for the cycle in the stadium and the fourth player in franchise history to hit for the cycle. The White Sox lost the game 8–7 in 10 innings. Attendance: (11,251)

=== 2000s ===
- April 27, 2000: White Sox José Valentín hits for the cycle against the Baltimore Orioles in the White Sox's 13–4 win becoming the 5th player in franchise history to hit for the cycle. Attendance: (13,225)
- September 13, 2002: The Rolling Stones, on their Licks Tour, play the first-ever concert held in the stadium.
- July 15, 2003: The stadium hosts the 74th MLB All-Star Game. The first All-Star game was played at Comiskey Park in 1933. Attendance: (47,609)
- July 25, 2003: White Sox hall of famer Frank Thomas hits his 400th career MLB homerun against the Tampa Bay Devil Rays off of pitcher Jorge Sosa becoming the 36th player in MLB history to do it. Attendance: (22,617)
- September 13–14, 2004: the stadium hosts two games between the Florida Marlins and the Montreal Expos, due to Hurricane Ivan in Florida. The Marlins sweep by scores of 6–3 and 8–6. The series returned to Florida to finish the last three games, with the Expos taking two. Game 1 attendance: (4,003). Game 2 attendance: (5,457)
- August 7, 2005: A life-sized bronze statue of catcher Carlton Fisk is unveiled on the center-field concourse behind section 164. The White Sox defeat the Seattle Mariners 3–1. Attendance: (35,706)
- October 5, 2005: The stadium hosted game 2 of the 2005 American League Division Series between the White Sox and the defending World Series champion Boston Red Sox with the White Sox up 1–0 in the series. The Red Sox led the game 4–0 heading into the 5th when the White Sox answered with a 5 run inning including an error by former White Sox shortstop Tony Graffanino when a ball hit by Juan Uribe went through the legs of Graffanino which could've got the inning ending double play but allowed the inning to continue. The rally was capped off by a go-ahead three-run home run by Tadahito Iguchi that won the game for the White Sox 5–4 and take a 2–0 series lead. The White Sox won their next game in Boston to sweep the Red Sox and move on to the ALCS. Attendance: (40,799)
- October 12, 2005: The stadium hosted game 2 of the 2005 American League Championship Series between the White Sox and the Los Angeles Angels with the Angels up 1–0 in the Series. The game was tied 1–1 in the bottom of the 9th inning with 2 outs. Angels pitcher Kelvim Escobar struck out A. J. Pierzynski when Pierzynski took a couple steps toward his dugout before he began to run to first base. Home plate umpire Doug Eddings said it was a uncaught third strike and had to be thrown to first which no throw was made because they all thought the inning was over and Pierzynski was called safe and allowed the inning to continue. Replay appeared to show the ball to be caught cleanly by catcher Josh Paul but replay review did not exist then and the call stood. The White Sox pinch-ran Pierzynski with Pablo Ozuna. Ozuna stole second before Joe Crede walked it off with a base hit off the left field wall and won the game for the White Sox 2–1 to tie the series at one game a piece. The White Sox won their next three in Anaheim to advance to the World Series for the first time since 1959. Attendance: (41,013)
- October 22, 2005: The first ever World Series game in this stadium between the Chicago White Sox and the Houston Astros. It was the White Sox's 5th World Series appearance, their first since 1959, and were looking to win their 3rd title in franchise history while it was the Houston Astros' first ever World Series appearance in the franchise's 44 year history. Luis Aparicio throws the ceremonial first pitch, then is joined by 1959 World Series teammates Jim Landis, J. C. Martin, Billy Pierce and Bob Shaw on the field. Josh Groban sings the national anthem. Craig Biggio of the Houston Astros is the game's first batter. Jermaine Dye's first-inning home run off Roger Clemens provides the game's first hit and run. The White Sox get their first World Series game victory since 1959, defeating the Houston Astros 5–3. Among the people attending the game was Robert Prevost, who later became Pope Leo XIV. Attendance: (41,206)
- October 23, 2005: The stadium hosted game 2 of the 2005 World Series the following night between the White Sox and Astros. The White Sox were trailing the Astros 4–2 in the bottom of the 7th. The White Sox had the bases loaded for Paul Konerko after the Astros brought in Chad Qualls to help them get out of the jam. Konerko hit a grand slam on the first pitch from Qualls to put the White Sox up 6–4. They held the lead until the 9th inning when closer Bobby Jenks had a blown save and allowed Astros pinch-hitter José Vizcaíno to tie the game on the first pitch with a 2 RBI single. In the bottom of the 9th, the Astros were attempting to force extra innings when Scott Podsednik, who hit zero Home Runs during the regular season, hit a walk-off Home Run off Brad Lidge to win the game for the White Sox 7–6 and take a 2–0 Series lead. It was the 14th walk-off home run in World Series history. The White Sox won the next two games in Houston to win the World Series, their first since 1917. Attendance: (41,432)
- October 28, 2005: After winning the 2005 World Series, the team's victory parade begins at U.S. Cellular Field, players boarding double-decker buses that travel north to downtown Chicago. A throng estimated at more than 200,000 celebrates the first White Sox championship since 1917.
- April 2, 2006: The Sox open the 2006 season with the unveiling of their 2005 World Series Championship banner on the left-center light tower. Three other banners are placed on the other light towers: One for the 1906 and 1917 World Series championships by the Sox on the far left tower. The one on the right-center tower is for all the team's American League Championships. The one on the far right is for all the division championships. The Sox defeat the Cleveland Indians 10–4. Attendance: (38,802)
- April 18, 2007: Mark Buehrle tossed a no-hitter against the Texas Rangers with it being the first no-hitter in the stadium, the 16th in franchise history, and the first no-hitter in franchise history since Wilson Álvarez in 1991. Attendance: (25,390)
- August 12, 2007: White Sox reliever Bobby Jenks tied a Major League record by retiring 41 consecutive batters. The White Sox lost to the Seattle Mariners 6–0. Attendance: (36,629)
- September 16, 2007: Hall of famer Jim Thome hits his 500th career home run in walk-off fashion to win it 9–7 against the Los Angeles Angels off of pitcher Dustin Moseley. Thome became the first player in MLB history to hit his 500th career homerun in walk-off fashion, the 23rd player in MLB history to join the 500 home run club, and the first and only to do it in a White Sox uniform. Attendance: (29,010)
- April 8, 2008: The Illinois Sports Facilities Authority unveil the first environmentally friendly permeable paving parking lot to be used by a Major League sports facility in parking lot L.
- April 11, 2008: The White Sox dedicate their new brick plaza to the 2005 World Series Champions and their fans. The Sox are defeated by the Detroit Tigers 5–2. Attendance: (26,094)
- May 7, 2008: Minnesota Twins Carlos Gómez hits for the cycle for the first time in his career against the White Sox in the Twins' 13–1 win. Gómez became the 8th player in franchise history and the third youngest player in MLB history to hit for the cycle. Attendance: (21,092)
- July 20, 2008: A life-sized bronze statue of Harold Baines is unveiled on the center-field concourse behind section 105. The Sox are defeated by the Kansas City Royals 8–7 and Jim Thome of the Sox collects his 2,000th career hit. Attendance: (32,269)
- August 14, 2008: White Sox hit four consecutive home runs against the Kansas City Royals with the batters being Jim Thome, Paul Konerko, Alexei Ramírez, and Juan Uribe off of Joel Peralta and Rob Tejeda. It was the 6th time in MLB history that an MLB team hit four consecutive home runs and the first time its ever happened in franchise history. Attendance: (32,788).
- September 29, 2008: White Sox came into a big game. If the White Sox won, they force an AL Central tiebreaker game against the Minnesota Twins the next day. The White Sox won the game 8–2 against the Detroit Tigers with rookie Alexei Ramírez hitting a go-ahead grand slam in the 6th. It was Ramírez's fourth grand slam of the season setting a single season record for most grand slams hit in a season by a rookie. Attendance: (35,923)
- September 30, 2008: U.S. Cellular Field hosted the 2008 American League Central tie-breaker game between the Minnesota Twins and the Chicago White Sox. The game decided who would win the American League Central and would face the Tampa Bay Rays in the American League Division Series. White Sox fans were encouraged to wear all black at the game to show their support, which they did. The game was a pitching duel between John Danks of the White Sox and Nick Blackburn of the Twins until the 7th when Jim Thome hit a go-ahead home run off of Blackburn to give the White Sox a 1–0 lead. The game ended on a diving catch by White Sox outfielder Brian Anderson and the White Sox won 1–0, clinching the AL Central Division. The White Sox lost to the eventual American League champion Tampa Bay Rays in four games in the ALDS. Attendance: (40,354)
- January 20, 2009: The White Sox display a banner outside of Gate 6 to honor White Sox fan Barack Obama's presidential inauguration.
- July 23, 2009: The first perfect game and second no-hitter at U.S. Cellular Field and the 18th perfect game in MLB history. Mark Buehrle strikes out six batters and records 11 ground ball outs to get a perfect game against the Tampa Bay Rays. The perfect game included an amazing play by White Sox outfielder DeWayne Wise, who came in as a defensive replacement, where he robbed a home run from Gabe Kapler in the top of the 9th. It is the second no-hitter of Buehrle's career, the last occurring on April 18, 2007, against the Texas Rangers. It was also the franchise's second perfect game with the last one being Charlie Robertson in 1922. He is the first player since Hideo Nomo to throw multiple no-hitters, and the first to throw a perfect game since Randy Johnson of the Arizona Diamondbacks did it May 18, 2004, against the Atlanta Braves at Turner Field. In a remarkable coincidence, Buehrle's first no-hitter was 2 hours and 3 minutes and Buehrle's second was just as long. Another coincidence was home plate umpire (#56, same as Buehrle's) Eric Cooper who called both Buehrle's no-hitters. Yet another coincidence is that Ramón Castro, who caught for Buehrle, wears the No. 27 on his jersey, the number of consecutive outs needed for a perfect game. It was also Cooper's third no-hitter called with his first one with Hideo Nomo on April 4, 2001. Attendance: (28,036)
- August 2, 2009: New York Yankees Melky Cabrera hits for the cycle against the White Sox in their 8–5 win becoming the 14th player in franchise history to hit for the cycle. Attendance: (36,325)

=== 2010s ===
- August 29, 2010: The White Sox host Frank Thomas Day at the ballpark against the New York Yankees. Thomas's jersey is retired, along with his image posted on the legends' wall in left-center field next to Billy Pierce on his left and Carlton Fisk on his right, and also right under "The Catch" logo. Yankees defeat the Sox 2–1. Attendance: (39,433)
- May 3, 2011: Minnesota Twins pitcher Francisco Liriano throws a no-hitter against the White Sox. It was the Twins' 7th no-hitter in franchise history and the first no-hitter in franchise history since Eric Milton in 1999. Attendance: (20,901)
- July 31, 2011: The White Sox unveil a replica statue of Frank Thomas on the outfield concourse behind section 160. The White Sox lose to the Boston Red Sox 5–3. Attendance: (28,278)
- April 25, 2014: White Sox rookie José Abreu broke the MLB rookie record for the most home runs in the month of March–April with nine in the first month of the season as he hit two home runs in the game against the Tampa Bay Rays including a walk-off grand slam in the bottom of the 9th to win the game 9–6 and break the record that was previously shared by Kent Hrbek in 1982, Carlos Delgado in 1994, and Albert Pujols in 2001. Attendance: (17,210)
- September 27, 2014: Paul Konerko is honored before the game for his retirement from baseball. A statue of him is unveiled on the left-field concourse next to Frank Thomas' Statue. Konerko was the last member of the 2005 Champion White Sox left on the team at the time of his retirement. The Sox defeat the Kansas City Royals 5–4. Attendance: (38,160)
- September 28, 2014: Paul Konerko played his final Major League game. Konerko started on first base before he was taken out of the game at the start of the top of the 6th by Andy Wilkins. Konerko walked off the field for the last time with a 2 minute standing ovation from the White Sox crowd. The White Sox lost to the Royals 6–4. Attendance: (32,266)
- May 23, 2015: Paul Konerko's number 14 is retired by the White Sox with a pregame ceremony. He became the 10th player to have his number retired by the White Sox. The White Sox were defeated by the Minnesota Twins 4–3. Attendance: (38,714)
- June 24, 2017: Mark Buehrle's number 56 is retired by the White Sox with a pregame ceremony. Buehrle becomes the 11th player in White Sox history to have a retired number. The White Sox were defeated by the Oakland Athletics 10–2. Attendance: (38,618)
- September 9, 2017: White Sox José Abreu hits for the cycle against the San Francisco Giants in the White Sox's 13–1 win becoming the 6th player in franchise history to hit for the cycle. Attendance: (17,688)
- September 2, 2018: White Sox host Hawk Harrelson day to honor their announcer Ken Harrelson in his final year of commentating. The White Sox beat the Boston Red Sox 8–0. Attendance: (30,745)
- September 23, 2018: White Sox announcer Ken Harrelson called his final game as a broadcaster. White Sox lost to the Chicago Cubs 6–1. After the game, teams and fans from both sides gave Hawk one final standing ovation and a tip of the cap as a thank you. Attendance: (39,449)

=== 2020s ===
- August 16, 2020: White Sox hit four consecutive home runs against the St. Louis Cardinals with the batters being Yoán Moncada, Yasmani Grandal, José Abreu, and Eloy Jiménez off of pitcher Roel Ramírez, who was making his MLB debut that day. It was 10th time in MLB history a team hit four consecutive home runs and the second time in franchise history. Attendance: No in–person attendance due to COVID-19 pandemic.
- August 25, 2020: White Sox pitcher Lucas Giolito throws a no-hitter against the Pittsburgh Pirates. The no-hitter was the 19th in White Sox history. Attendance: No in–person attendance due to COVID-19 pandemic.
- September 17, 2020: White Sox clinch a playoff berth for the first time since 2008 with a 4–3 win against the Minnesota Twins. Attendance: No in–person attendance due to COVID-19 pandemic.
- April 14, 2021: White Sox pitcher Carlos Rodón pitched a no-hitter against the Cleveland Indians. Rodón had a perfect game going into the 9th and got the first out with an amazing stretch play by José Abreu before he hit Roberto Pérez in the foot ending his chances of a perfect game. Rodón retired the next two batters he faced completing the 20th no-hitter in franchise history. Attendance: (7,148) Limited in–person attendance due to COVID-19 pandemic.
- May 25, 2021: Long time Major League Baseball umpire Joe West umpired his 5,376th game passing Bill Klem for most games ever umpired. Attendance: (16,380) Limited in–person attendance due to COVID-19 pandemic.
- June 6, 2021: White Sox manager Tony La Russa won his 2,764th game as manager passing John McGraw for second on the All-time manager wins list. Attendance: (20,068) Limited in–person attendance due to COVID-19 pandemic.
- July 31, 2021: White Sox catcher Seby Zavala became the first player in MLB history to hit his first three career home runs in the same game. The White Sox lost to the Cleveland Indians 12–11. Attendance: 35,866
- October 10, 2021: Guaranteed Rate Field hosted its first playoff game since 2008 with game 3 of the 2021 American League Division Series with the Houston Astros facing the White Sox with the Astros taking a 2–0 series lead and looking for a sweep. The game went back and forth in the first four innings with the White Sox scoring first in the first inning before the Astros answered with 5 of their own in the next two innings and took a 5–1 lead in the third. The White Sox answered with a 5 spot in the bottom of the third with home runs by Yasmani Grandal and Leury García to take a 6–5 lead. The Astros tied it in the fourth before the White Sox answered with a 3 spot in the bottom of the fourth and eventually won the game 12–6 to force game 4, which they lost. Attendance: (40,288)
- May 9, 2022: Cleveland Guardians' Josh Naylor became the first player in MLB history to hit two three-run home runs or grand slams in the ninth inning or later and the first player to have at least eight RBI in the eighth inning or later the same game. Naylor led a ninth inning comeback where the Guardians were down 8–2 to the White Sox where they rallied off 2 runs before Naylor came up to bat and crushed a game-tying grand slam. Naylor appeared in the top of 11th where the game was tied 9–9 and Naylor hit a go-ahead three run home run to give the Guardians a 12–9 win. Attendance: (17,168).
- April 30, 2023: The White Sox were trailing 9–5 to the Tampa Bay Rays in the bottom of the 9th and came back and won 12–9 with a 7 run inning that was capped off by a walk–off three–run home run by Andrew Vaughn. The win snapped a 10–game losing streak. Attendance: (17,049)
- May 29, 2023: White Sox closer Liam Hendriks appeared in his first Major League game since defeating cancer after he was diagnosed with Non-Hodgkin lymphoma on January 8 that same year. Hendriks was greeted with a standing ovation from the crowd at the park. Hendriks went through one inning and only gave up two runs in the White Sox 6–4 loss to the Los Angeles Angels. Attendance: (23,599)
- August 25, 2023: Three spectators were injured by a stray bullet. The suspect "reportedly snuck the gun in past metal detectors hiding it in the folds of her belly fat." A post-game concert was supposed to be held after the game for the I Love the 90s Tour with singers Vanilla Ice, Rob Base, and Tone Loc to perform but that was cancelled for the reasoning being "technical issues." Attendance: (21,906)
- July 10, 2024: White Sox pitcher Michael Kopech threw the stadium's first immaculate inning, against the Minnesota Twins, while also picking up a save to preserve the White Sox 3–1 victory in the first game of a doubleheader. Kopech became just the second White Sox pitcher in franchise history to throw an immaculate inning and the first since Sloppy Thurston in 1923. Attendance: (13,607)
- July 11, 2025: A life-sized bronze statue of Mark Buehrle is unveiled in the right field concourse in Section 105. It was the start of the teams' 20th Anniversary World Series reunion weekend. The White Sox beat the Cleveland Guardians 5–4 in 11 innings. Attendance: (25,084)
- July 12, 2025: A pregame ceremony was held in honor of the 20th Anniversary of the White Sox's 2005 World Series championship with every member from the championship team except for closer Bobby Jenks, who died 8 days before the ceremony from stomach cancer. It also had a special jersey that was gifted to Paul Konerko by Chicago Cardinal Blase Cupich that was signed by world famous White Sox fan Pope Leo XIV with the Jersey having the #14 that Konerko wore with Konerko and Leo's name on the back of the jersey. The ceremony also had a special tribute to the late closer Bobby Jenks. Konerko threw out the ceremonial first pitch to catcher A. J. Pierzynski. The White Sox lost to the Cleveland Guardians 6–2. Attendance: (21,785)
- August 15–16, 2025: The Savannah Bananas and the Firefighters of Banana Ball came to Rate Field for two nights. The two nights combined for an attendance of more than 80,000 people. The Bananas had former White Sox players and 2005 World Series champions A. J. Pierzynski, Mark Buehrle, and Paul Konerko with Pierzynski and Konerko taking at bats and Buehrle pitching as well as Pierzynski being the catcher and also invited former World Series winning manager Ozzie Guillén to be the first base coach and also be a part of one of the Bananas' dance routines.
- July 10, 2026: White Sox Tristan Peters hits for the cycle against the Athletics in the White Sox's 14–1 victory becoming the 7th player in White Sox history to hit for the cycle. Attendance: (37,539)
- August 8, 2026: Ozzie Guillén's number 13 is retired by the White Sox with a pregame ceremony. Guillén the 12th player and first Manager in White Sox history to have a number retired. The White Sox beat the Cleveland Guardians 6–3. Attendance: (38,227)

== White Sox record at home ==
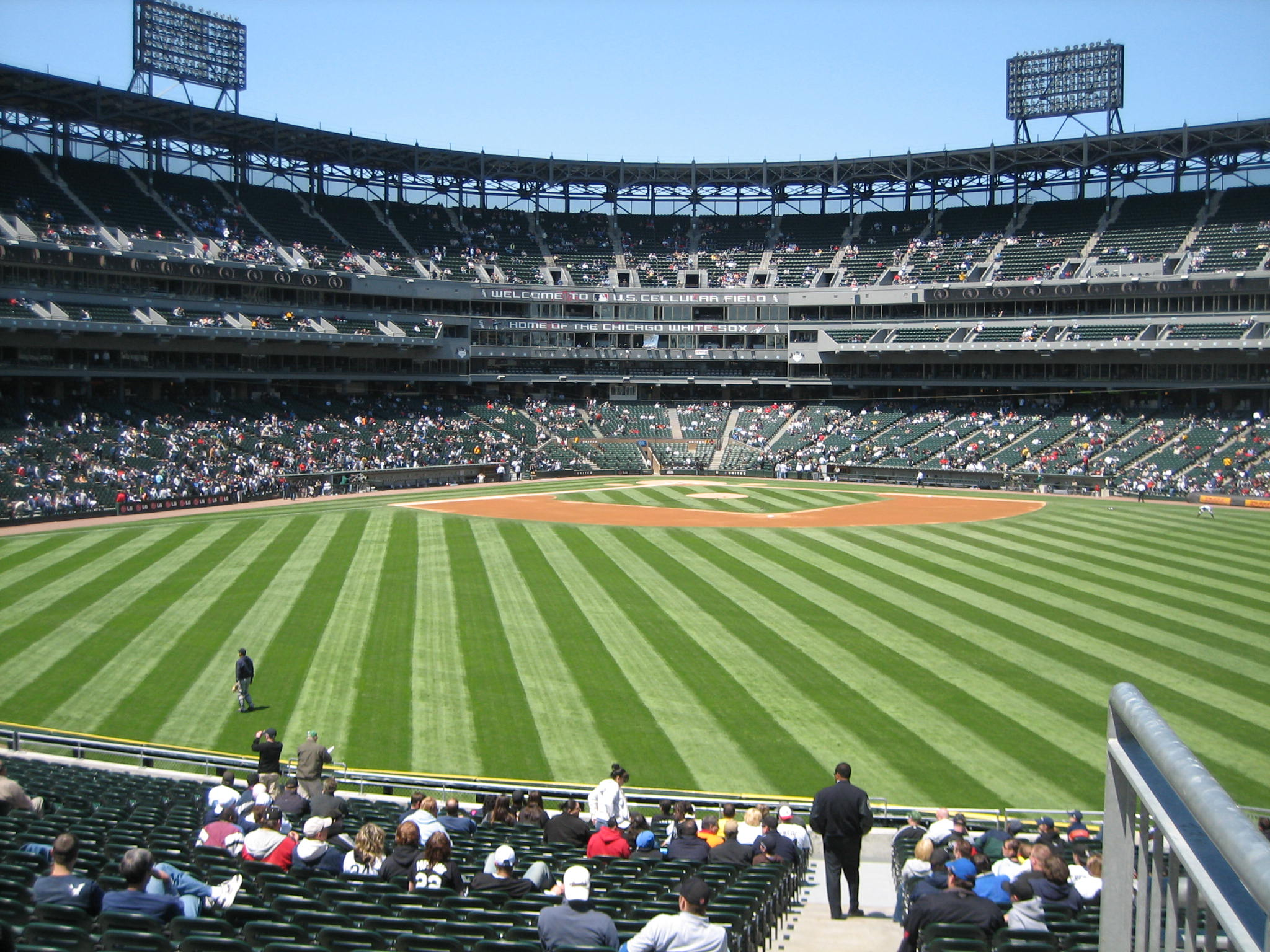
Rate Field before a game

Year	Regular Season Home			Regular Season Overall			Finish	Post Season Home			Post Season Overall		
Year	Won	Lost	Win %	Won	Lost	Win %	Finish	Won	Lost	Win %	Won	Lost	Win %
1991	46	35	.567	87	75	.537	2nd in AL West	–	–	–	–	–	–
1992	50	32	.609	86	76	.531	3rd in AL West	–	–	–	–	–	–
1993	45	36	.556	94	68	.580	1st in AL West	0	3	.000	2	4	.333
1994	34	19	.641	67	46	.593	1st in AL Central	–	–	–	–	–	–
1995	38	34	.527	68	76	.472	3rd in AL Central	–	–	–	–	–	–
1996	44	37	.543	85	77	.525	2nd in AL Central	–	–	–	–	–	–
1997	45	36	.556	80	81	.496	2nd in AL Central	–	–	–	–	–	–
1998	44	37	.543	80	82	.493	2nd in AL Central	–	–	–	–	–	–
1999	38	42	.475	75	86	.466	2nd in AL Central	–	–	–	–	–	–
2000	46	35	.567	95	67	.586	1st in AL Central	0	2	.000	0	3	.000
2001	46	35	.567	83	79	.512	3rd in AL Central	–	–	–	–	–	–
2002	47	34	.580	81	81	.500	2nd in AL Central	–	–	–	–	–	–
2003	51	30	.629	86	76	.530	2nd in AL Central	–	–	–	–	–	–
2004	46	35	.567	83	79	.512	2nd in AL Central	–	–	–	–	–	–
2005	47	34	.580	99	63	.611	1st in AL Central	5	1	.833	11	1	.917
2006	49	32	.604	90	72	.556	3rd in AL Central	–	–	–	–	–	–
2007	38	43	.469	72	90	.444	4th in AL Central	–	–	–	–	–	–
2008	54	28	.658	89	74	.546	1st in AL Central	1	1	.500	1	3	.250
2009	43	38	.531	79	83	.488	3rd in AL Central	–	–	–	–	–	–
2010	45	36	.556	88	74	.543	2nd in AL Central	–	–	–	–	–	–
2011	36	45	.444	79	83	.488	3rd in AL Central	–	–	–	–	–	–
2012	45	36	.556	85	77	.525	2nd in AL Central	–	–	–	–	–	–
2013	37	44	.457	63	99	.389	5th in AL Central	–	–	–	–	–	–
2014	40	41	.494	73	89	.451	4th in AL Central	–	–	–	–	–	–
2015	40	41	.494	76	86	.469	4th in AL Central	–	–	–	–	–	–
2016	45	36	.555	78	84	.481	4th in AL Central	–	–	–	–	–	–
2017	39	42	.481	67	95	.414	4th in AL Central	–	–	–	–	–	–
2018	30	51	.370	62	100	.383	4th in AL Central	–	–	–	–	–	–
2019	39	41	.487	72	89	.447	3rd in AL Central	–	–	–	–	–	–
2020	18	12	.600	35	25	.583	3rd in AL Central	–	–	–	1	2	.333
2021	53	28	.650	93	69	.654	1st in AL Central	1	1	.500	1	3	.250
2022	37	44	.457	81	81	.500	2nd in AL Central	–	–	–	–	–	–
2023	31	50	.383	61	101	.377	4th in AL Central	–	–	–	–	–	–
2024	23	58	.284	41	121	.253	5th in AL Central	–	–	–	–	–	–
2025	33	48	.407	60	102	.370	5th in AL Central	–	–	–	–	–	–
Total	1,442	1,305	.525	2,694	2,806	.490	–	7	8	.466	16	16	.500

Notes: 1994 season incomplete due to Players Strike. Only 113 games played.
Only 144 games played in 1995.
Only 161 games played in 1997, 1999 and 2019.
163 games played in 2008 due to AL Central division tie-breaker game.

Only 60 games played in 2020 due to the COVID-19 pandemic.

80 home games played at Guaranteed Rate Field in 2021 with 1 played at Field of Dreams.

All-Time record
Home			Overall		
Won	Lost	Win %	Won	Lost	Win %
1,442	1,305	.525	2,694	2,806	.490

== Attendance ==
Home attendance at Rate Field
Year	Total attendance	Games	Game average	Major League rank
1991	2,934,154	81	36,224	3rd
1992	2,681,156	82	32,697	4th
1993	2,581,091	81	31,865	11th
1994	1,697,398	53	32,026	11th
1995	1,609,773	72	22,358	17th
1996	1,676,403	81	20,696	19th
1997	1,864,782	81	23,022	16th
1998	1,391,146	81	16,965	27th
1999	1,338,851	80	16,529	28th
2000	1,947,799	81	24,047	20th
2001	1,766,172	81	21,805	26th
2002	1,676,911	81	20,703	23rd
2003	1,939,524	81	23,945	21st
2004	1,930,537	81	23,834	21st
2005	2,342,833	81	28,924	17th
2006	2,957,414	81	36,511	9th
2007	2,684,395	81	33,141	15th
2008	2,500,648	82	30,496	16th
2009	2,284,163	81	28,200	16th
2010	2,194,378	81	27,091	17th
2011	2,001,117	81	24,705	20th
2012	1,965,955	81	24,271	24th
2013	1,768,413	81	21,832	24th
2014	1,650,821	81	20,381	28th
2015	1,755,810	81	21,677	27th
2016	1,746,293	81	21,559	26th
2017	1,629,470	81	20,117	28th
2018	1,608,817	81	19,862	25th
2019	1,649,775	80	20,622	24th
2020	0	30	0	–
2021	1,596,385	81	19,708	13th
2022	2,009,359	81	24,807	19th
2023	1,669,628	81	20,613	24th
2024	1,380,733	81	17,046	27th
2025	1,445,738	81	17,849	27th

== Non-baseball events ==
=== Concerts ===
Date	Artist	Opening act(s)	Tour / Concert name	Attendance	Revenue
September 13, 2002	The Rolling Stones	The Pretenders	Licks Tour	—	—
August 13, 2003	Bruce Springsteen and the E Street Band	—	The Rising Tour	39,439	$2,970,543
September 24, 2016	Chance the Rapper	—	Magnificent Coloring Day Festival	47,754	—
September 7, 2023	RBD	—	Soy Rebelde Tour	63,763	$13,177,722
September 8, 2023	RBD	—	Soy Rebelde Tour	63,763	$13,177,722

=== Football ===
Date	Event name	Home team	Visiting Team	Winning team/Score	Attendance	Notes
November 9, 2016	Huskie Chi–Town Showdown	Northern Illinois Huskies	Toledo Rockets	Toledo, 31–24	10,180	First football game played at Guaranteed Rate Field

== In film and other media ==
Rate Field has appeared in films such as Rookie of the Year (1993), Major League II (1994), Little Big League (1994), My Best Friend's Wedding (1997), and The Ladies Man (2000). In Rookie of the Year, the stadium played the role of Dodger Stadium, and in Little Big League, it played the role of all opposing ballparks except for Yankee Stadium and Fenway Park. Commercials for the PGA Tour, Nike, Reebok, and the Boys & Girls Clubs of America have been filmed at the park.

== See also ==
- Gene Honda – Public address announcer for the White Sox, DePaul Basketball, Chicago Blackhawks, Illinois Football, and the NCAA Men's Division I Basketball Championship Final Four.
- Roger Bossard – Head groundskeeper for the White Sox. (1983–present)
- Nancy Faust – Long-time stadium organist for the White Sox. (1970–2010)
- Southpaw – White Sox mascot.
- Camelback Ranch – The spring training home of the White Sox shared with the Los Angeles Dodgers. (2009–present)

== Notes ==
- Nathaniel Whalen, "Marked seats meaningful to Sox stars", Post Tribune, March 30, 2007

Events and tenants
Preceded by Comiskey Park	Home of the Chicago White Sox; 1991 – present	Succeeded by Current
Preceded by Miller Park	Host of the MLB All-Star Game; 2003	Succeeded by Minute Maid Park
Preceded by Turner Field	Host of the Civil Rights Game; 2013	Succeeded by Minute Maid Park
