= Jason Grimsley =

American baseball player (born 1967)

- Pitcher
- Born: August 7, 1967 (age 58); Cleveland, Texas, U.S.
- Batted: Right Threw: Right

MLB debut
- September 8, 1989, for the Philadelphia Phillies

Last MLB appearance
- May 31, 2006, for the Arizona Diamondbacks

MLB statistics
- Win–loss record: 42–58
- Earned run average: 4.77
- Strikeouts: 622
- Stats at Baseball Reference

Teams
- Philadelphia Phillies (1989–1991); Cleveland Indians (1993–1995); California Angels (1996); New York Yankees (1999–2000); Kansas City Royals (2001–2004); Baltimore Orioles (2004–2005); Arizona Diamondbacks (2006)

Career highlights and awards
- 2× World Series champion (1999, 2000)

Jason Alan Grimsley (born August 7, 1967) is an American former Major League Baseball relief pitcher who played for seven teams during a 15-year career. He was a member of both the 1999 and 2000 World Series champion New York Yankees.

== Major League career ==
Jason attended Tarkington High School in Cleveland, Texas. He was selected 10th round (252nd overall) by the Philadelphia Phillies of the 1985 June amateur Baseball draft. Like many relief pitchers, Grimsley began his career as a starting pitcher. But he became a full-time reliever while a member of the Yankees.

=== Philadelphia Phillies (1989–1991) ===
Grimsley began his career in 1989 and surrendered 13 runs in 18 1/3 innings. The following year, he went 3–2 and made 11 starts. In 1991, Grimsley went 1–7 with a 4.87 ERA in 12 starts. Following the 1991 season, he was traded to the Houston Astros for Curt Schilling.

=== Out of the league and Cleveland Indians (1992–1995) ===
Grimsley spent the entire 1992 season in the minors and on March 30, 1993, was released by Houston and signed with the Cleveland Indians. In his first season with Cleveland, he went 3–4 over 10 games, and in 1994, went 5–2 with a 4.57 ERA in 14 games. Grimsley is known for his leading role in the 1994 Bat Burglary involving Albert Belle and an allegedly corked bat that was taken away by umpires for examination by the league. Grimsley was the player who crawled through a Comiskey Park air conditioning duct to reach the room where the confiscated bat had been secured. He took the corked bat and replaced it with a clean bat. Not accounted for in this plan, however, was that Belle's bat had his name on it, and the replacement had teammate Paul Sorrento's name on it instead, leading to the heist being caught before the end of the day. The incident made ESPN.com's "Biggest Cheaters in Baseball" list at number 4. The next season, Grimsley was used mostly as a reliever, making only two starts. Following the season, on February 14, 1996, he was traded to the Angels.

=== California Angels (1996) ===
Grimsley went 5–7 with a 6.84 ERA in 1996 while making a career-high 20 starts. On October 8, he was granted free agency.

=== Out of the league again (1997–1998) ===
Grimsley signed with the Tigers on January 17, 1997, but was released following spring training. On April 3, he signed with the Brewers and on July 29, was traded to the Royals for Jamie Brewington. Grimsley was granted free agency on October 15. On January 8, 1998, he signed with the Cleveland Indians. Grimsley did not appear in a major league game that year and was granted free agency on October 15.

=== New York Yankees (1999–2000) ===
Grimsley signed with the Yankees on January 26, 1999. With the Yankees, he rebounded, going 7–2 with a 3.60 ERA in 55 relief outings. Grimsley did not pitch in the 1999 American League Division Series or the 1999 American League Championship Series, but pitched 2 1/3 innings of two-hit, two-walk ball in Game 3 of the 1999 World Series. In 2000, he was 3–2 with a 5.04 ERA. In the 2000 ALCS, he pitched one scoreless inning and earned his second World Series ring when the Yankees defeated the Mets in five games despite not pitching in the World Series. On November 20, he was released by the Yankees.

=== Kansas City Royals (2001–2004) ===
Grimsley signed with the Royals on January 19, 2001. In his first season in Kansas City, he was 1–5. In three and a half years in Kansas City, Grimsley never posted a record better than .500 (he was 3–3 in 2004). He was 1–5 in 2001, 4–7 in 2002, and 2–6 in 2003. Grimsley also gave up the home run to Scott Hatteberg that gave the Oakland Athletics their 20th straight win in 2002, as depicted in the film Moneyball. On October 29, 2003, he was granted free agency, but re-signed on December 7. In 2004, Grimsley went 3–3 with a 3.38 ERA before being traded on June 21 to the Orioles for Denny Bautista.

=== Baltimore Orioles (2004–2005) ===
Grimsley went 2–4 in 2004 with Baltimore. In 2005, he posted a 1–3 record with a 5.73 ERA, and was granted free agency on October 27.

=== Arizona Diamondbacks (2006) ===
In 2006, Grimsley finished 1–2 with a 4.88 ERA in 19 games before being released on June 7 after his use of performance-enhancing drugs came to light. He subsequently retired.

== Illicit drug use ==
On June 6, 2006, it was reported that federal officials had raided Grimsley's home looking for evidence that he was distributing human growth hormone (HGH) and other performance-enhancing drugs.

The Arizona Diamondbacks released him at his request, shortly after it became public in June 2006 that he had admitted to using performance-enhancing drugs. The Diamondbacks announced they would not pay the rest of his 2006 salary, an estimated US$875,000. Grimsley's agent Joe Bick stated that Grimsley would contest the decision. Michael Weiner, general counsel to the players union stated that the union would file a grievance on his behalf.

On June 12, 2006, Grimsley was suspended for 50 games for violating Major League Baseball's Joint Drug Prevention and Treatment Program. This penalty would take effect if Grimsley ever signed a contract with a major league team and was placed on a 40-man roster. He was the fourteenth Major League Baseball player to be suspended for use of performance-enhancing drugs.

ESPN reported that court documents showed that Grimsley had failed an MLB-administered drug test in 2003; he subsequently confessed to the use of human growth hormones, amphetamines and steroids.

His drug use began in 1998 while in Buffalo, New York. After a nine-year MLB career, he was in the minors trying to get back to the majors after a shoulder injury. Among the drugs he has used are Deca-Durabolin, amphetamines, human growth hormone and Clenbuterol. Prior to the use of performance-enhancing drugs he had earned a total of $1 million; subsequently he earned $9 million. His ERA dropped by a run.

On September 30, 2006, the Los Angeles Times reported that Grimsley told federal agents investigating steroids in baseball that Houston Astros pitchers Roger Clemens and Andy Pettitte were users of performance-enhancing drugs and that Baltimore Orioles's Miguel Tejada, Jay Gibbons, and Brian Roberts were users of "anabolic steroids."

On October 3, 2006, The Washington Post reported that San Francisco United States attorney Kevin Ryan said that the Los Angeles Times report contained "significant inaccuracies." All five players named (Clemens, Pettitte, Tejada, Gibbons, and Roberts) denounced the story, with Clemens calling it "dangerous and malicious and reckless". Gibbons was later implicated in the steroid scandal by Sports Illustrated, who uncovered receipts issued by a Florida steroid mail order company in his name.

On December 13, 2007, he was cited in the Mitchell Report, an investigation into the use of anabolic steroids and HGH in Major League Baseball.

On December 20, 2007, the report was unsealed by a U.S. magistrate, who harshly criticized the L.A. Times for what he called "irresponsible reporting"...or "manufacturing of facts." Neither Roberts, Clemens, nor Pettitte's names were mentioned by Grimsley in any context whatsoever. The Times announced that it would publish a correction and apology for their misrepresentation of the facts. Grimsley had told investigators that he got amphetamines, anabolic steroids and human growth hormone from someone recommended to him by former Yankees trainer Brian McNamee. The fact that McNamee was a personal strength coach for Clemens and Pettitte apparently prompted the Times to leap to the erroneous conclusion that Grimsley had implicated them in his statement.

== Personal life ==
Grimsley is married to his wife Dana, and they have three children, two sons, Hunter and John-John, and a daughter Rayne.

On January 21, 2005, a small plane crashed into the back of Grimsley's house in Overland Park, Kansas. Grimsley was not home at the time, but his wife, daughter, and nanny were; they escaped unharmed. The pilot and four passengers were killed.

== See also ==
- List of sportspeople sanctioned for doping offences
- List of Major League Baseball players named in the Mitchell Report
