= 1994 Cleveland Indians corked bat incident =

Baseball cheating scandal

Cleveland Indians	Chicago White Sox
3	2
	1	2	3	4	5	6	7	8	9	R	H	E
Cleveland Indians	1	0	1	0	1	0	0	0	0	3	9	0
Chicago White Sox	0	0	1	0	0	0	1	0	0	2	6	0
- Date: July 15, 1994
- Venue: Comiskey Park II
- City: Chicago, Illinois, U.S.
- Managers: Mike Hargrove (Cleveland Indians); Gene Lamont (Chicago White Sox)
- Umpires: HP: Dave Phillips; 1B: Joe Brinkman; 2B: Tim McClelland; 3B: Dale Scott
- Attendance: 38,686
- Time of game: 2:43

The 1994 Cleveland Indians corked bat incident took place on July 15, 1994, at Comiskey Park in Chicago during a game between the Cleveland Indians and the Chicago White Sox.

In the first inning, White Sox manager Gene Lamont was tipped off that Indians batter Albert Belle was using a corked baseball bat. Under the rules of Major League Baseball, a manager may challenge one opponent's baseball bat per game. Lamont challenged Belle's bat with umpire Dave Phillips, who confiscated the bat and locked it in the umpires' dressing room.

== The heist ==
The Indians, knowing the bat was indeed corked, dispatched relief pitcher Jason Grimsley to retrieve the bat. Grimsley took a bat belonging to Indians player Paul Sorrento and accessed the area above the false ceiling in the clubhouse and crawled across with a flashlight in his mouth until he reached the umpires' room. He switched Belle's bat with Sorrento's and returned to the clubhouse. During the sixth inning, the umpires' custodian noticed clumps of ceiling tile on the floor of the umpire's room, plus twisted metal brackets in the ceiling. After the game, Phillips noticed the bats were different when he saw that the replacement bat was not as shiny and also was stamped with Sorrento's signature. The Chicago police were called and the White Sox threatened charges against the burglar. An investigation that Saturday was carried out by a former FBI agent flown in by MLB. The equipment room was dusted for fingerprints and the path the burglar took was discovered.

== Recovery and judgment ==
The Indians were ordered by the American League to produce Belle's original, unaltered bat. Initially, the AL had threatened to involve the FBI in regards to the burglary, but they dropped the issue in exchange for the bat. On July 18, the bat was sent to MLB in New York where it was x-rayed and then sawed in half in the presence of Belle and Indians GM John Hart. The bat was found to be corked and Belle was suspended by the AL for 10 games. On appeal, his suspension was dropped to seven games. The reduction made no difference in the end, as Major League Baseball soon suspended play due to the 1994–95 players strike.

== Grimsley comes clean ==
Initially, Grimsley's participation in the caper was a secret. In 1999, when he was a pitcher for the New York Yankees, Grimsley revealed his participation in an interview with The New York Times. He stated that he had used Sorrento's bat to replace Belle's because all of Belle's bats were corked. This story was corroborated by teammate Omar Vizquel in his 2002 autobiography, where he also said that all of Belle's bats were corked. Belle, however, continued to assert that he never used a corked bat. In a 2024 interview, Belle said he was able to laugh about the incident.
