= Albert Belle =

American baseball player (born 1966)

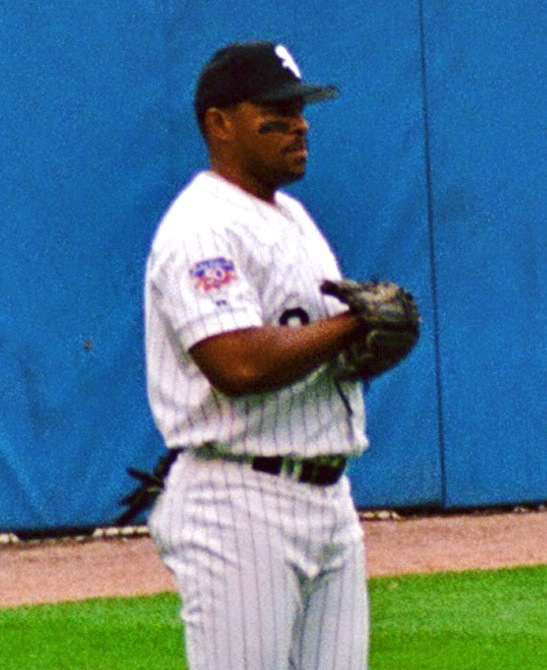
- Belle with the Chicago White Sox in 1997
- Left fielder
- Born: August 25, 1966 (age 60); Shreveport, Louisiana, U.S.
- Batted: Right Threw: Right

MLB debut
- July 15, 1989, for the Cleveland Indians

Last MLB appearance
- October 1, 2000, for the Baltimore Orioles

MLB statistics
- Batting average: .295
- Home runs: 381
- Runs batted in: 1,239
- Stats at Baseball Reference

Teams
- Cleveland Indians (1989–1996); Chicago White Sox (1997–1998); Baltimore Orioles (1999–2000)

Career highlights and awards
- 5× All-Star (1993–1997); 5× Silver Slugger Award (1993–1996, 1998); AL home run leader (1995); 3× AL RBI leader (1993, 1995, 1996); Cleveland Guardians Hall of Fame
Medals
Men's baseball
Representing United States
World Junior Baseball Championship
Silver medal – second place	1984 Saskatoon	Team

Albert Jojuan Belle Jr. (born August 25, 1966), until 1990 known as Joey Belle, is an American former Major League Baseball outfielder who played from 1989 to 2000, most notably for the Cleveland Indians. Known for his taciturn personality and intimidating stature, Belle was one of the leading sluggers of his time, and in 1995 became the only player to ever hit 50 doubles and 50 home runs in a season, despite the season being only 144 games. He was also the first player to break the $10 million per year compensation contract in Major League Baseball (MLB).

Belle was a five-time All-Star and Silver Slugger. He retired with a .295 career batting average, and averaged 37 home runs and 120 runs batted in (RBIs) per season between 1991 and 2000. He is one of only 10 players in MLB history to have nine consecutive 100-RBI seasons.

== Early life ==
Albert and his fraternal twin, Terry, were born on August 25, 1966, in Shreveport, Louisiana, the son of Albert Belle Sr., a high school baseball and football coach, and Carrie Belle, a former math teacher. He attained the rank of Eagle Scout in the Boy Scouts of America. Belle attended Huntington High School in Shreveport, where he was a star baseball and football player, a member of the National Honor Society, and vice president of the local Future Business Leaders of America. He graduated sixth in his high school class and made the all-state baseball team twice. In 1984, he was selected to play for the US in the Junior Olympics, in which the U.S. won a silver medal. He played outfield and pitched, winning one game. After graduation, Belle accepted a baseball scholarship to Louisiana State University.

== College ==
Belle played college baseball at Louisiana State University from 1985 to 1987, where he made first-team All-SEC in 1986 and 1987 and played in 184 games, with 585 at bats, 194 hits, 30 doubles, 49 home runs, 172 RBIs, 157 runs, a .670 slugging percentage, and a .332 batting average. In 1986, he played collegiate summer baseball in the Cape Cod Baseball League for the Chatham A's and was named a league all-star, then returned to the league in 1987 to play for the Hyannis Mets.

In his junior year, he was batting .349 when a heckler yelled racial epithets at him during an SEC tournament game. Belle chased the heckler into the stands, leading to a suspension that kept him out of the College World Series.

After college, Belle was drafted by the Cleveland Indians in the second round (47th overall) of the 1987 Major League Baseball draft. Despite his talent, Belle's stock fell due to his volatile temper. For example, Atlanta Braves general manager Bobby Cox told his farm director that he would be fired on the spot if he picked Belle.

== Professional career ==
=== Cleveland Indians ===
Belle made his major league debut on July 15, 1989, going 1-for-4 with one RBI in a 7–1 win against the Texas Rangers. He recorded an RBI single off Rangers pitcher Nolan Ryan in his first career at bat. On July 19, Belle hit his first major league home run and went 2-for-4, helping Cleveland to a 10–1 victory over the Minnesota Twins. He ultimately played in 62 games during his first season, batting .225 with seven home runs and 37 RBIs.

Belle became the fourth player to have eight straight seasons of 30 home runs and 100 RBIs, joining Babe Ruth, Jimmie Foxx, and Lou Gehrig (a feat since matched by Albert Pujols, Rafael Palmeiro, Manny Ramirez, and Alex Rodriguez). He was an accomplished baserunner, with a career-high 23 steals in 1993, and 17 steals in 1999 despite hip problems that plagued him late in his career. He led the league three times in RBIs, three times in total bases, three times in extra-base hits, and twice in slugging. He was a five-time All-Star between 1993 and 1997. He had a strong throwing arm and was a gifted pitcher in high school. His range factor by games played was consistently higher than the major league average at that position; nevertheless, he still managed to accrue a -63 "total zone runs" during 12 major league seasons.

Belle's career highs in home runs, RBIs, batting average, runs scored, and walks occurred in five separate seasons. In 2006, the Hardball Times published a statistical comparison of Belle's career statistics with those of 60 of his current and former peers. The article ranked him in career "prime value", behind Hall of Famers Ralph Kiner and Frank Thomas.

In 1992, Belle would have become one of only five players in MLB history to hit a home run over the left-field roof of Detroit's Tiger Stadium (joining Harmon Killebrew, Frank Howard, Cecil Fielder, and Mark McGwire), but the ball struck a light tower on top of the roof and fell back into the stands.

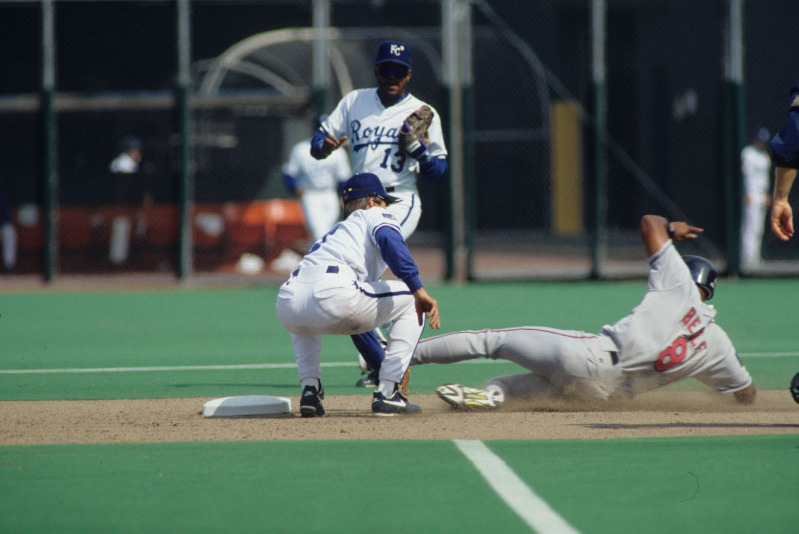
Belle (right) attempting to steal second base during a 1994 game against the Kansas City Royals at Kauffman Stadium

In 1994, Belle lost the batting title to New York Yankees outfielder Paul O'Neill, .359 to .357. In 1995, Belle became the first player in MLB history to hit 50 home runs and 50 doubles in the same season; the last player before him to reach as many as 40 in both categories had been Willie Stargell in 1973. The achievement was more impressive because Belle played only 143 games in 1995 due to a season shortened by the previous year's player strike.

Belle's surly reputation and disdain of the media cost him votes for the 1995 MVP Award. He finished second in the voting to the Boston Red Sox' Mo Vaughn, though he led the American League that season in runs scored, home runs, RBIs, slugging percentage, and total bases, and outpaced Vaughn head-to-head in every important offensive category except RBIs (both men had 126); both players' teams reached the playoffs. This was in the middle of a three-year streak in which Belle finished third, second, and third for the American League MVP. Belle had two other top-10 MVP finishes, in 1993 (seventh) and 1998 (eighth).

=== Chicago White Sox ===
On November 19, 1996, Belle signed a five-year, $55 million (equivalent to $110 million today) deal with the Chicago White Sox as a free agent. This contract made him the highest-paid player in baseball for a brief period and the first player in baseball history to make $10 million in a season. He enjoyed two great seasons in Chicago, including a career-high 27-game hitting streak in May 1997, and came close to another 50/50 season in 1998 with 49 home runs (a White Sox team record that still stands) and 48 doubles. He also drove in 152 runs to break Zeke Bonura's single-season franchise record of 138 in 1936 (to date, the RBI total also remains a White Sox single-season record). Additionally, when Cal Ripken Jr. ended his record consecutive game streak at 2,632 in September 1998, Belle took over as MLB's active leader in the category (his streak of 392 consecutive games ended the next year due to a perceived lack of hustle, as perceived by his manager).

=== Baltimore Orioles and retirement ===
Belle's contract with the White Sox had an unusual clause allowing him to demand that he would remain one of the three highest-paid players in baseball. In October 1998, he invoked the clause, and when the White Sox declined to give him a raise, he immediately became a free agent. He again became the game's highest-paid player, signing a five-year, $65 million ($126 million today) deal with the Baltimore Orioles on December 1, 1998. His career ended just two seasons later, though, when he was forced into retirement at age 34 by degenerative hip osteoarthritis. He was kept on Baltimore's active 40-man roster for the next three years as a condition of the insurance policy that largely reimbursed the Orioles for the remainder of his contract.

Belle homered in the final at-bat of his MLB career at Oriole Park at Camden Yards on October 1, 2000.

In 1,539 games over 12 seasons, Belle posted a .295 batting average (1,726-for-5,853) with 974 runs, 389 doubles, 21 triples, 381 home runs, 1,239 RBIs, 88 stolen bases, 683 bases on balls, .369 on-base percentage, and .564 slugging percentage. Defensively, he recorded a .976 fielding percentage playing at left and right field. In 18 postseason games, he hit .230 (14-for-61) with 10 runs, two doubles, six home runs, 14 RBIs, one stolen base, and 14 walks.

== Personal problems ==
In 1990, the Indians sent Belle to the Cleveland Clinic for two months for alcoholism rehabilitation.

Belle was suspended in 1994 for using a corked bat, resulting in a seven-game suspension. The incident gained further notoriety when teammate Jason Grimsley crawled through the building's ceiling panels to break into the locked umpires' dressing room, where he replaced Belle's corked bat with a teammate's bat. The revelation of Belle's use of corked bats was later given more emphasis when Cleveland teammate Omar Vizquel wrote in his 2002 autobiography that it would be naive to suggest otherwise, and that "all of Albert's bats were corked." Belle strongly denied the charge. (Later studies demonstrated that the longtime major league practice of illegally corking bats didn't actually produce a net positive effect.)

Belle was fined in 1996 for knocking down Brewers infielder Fernando Viña, who had blocked his way between bases.

A profane outburst directed at a group of reporters in his team's dugout was widely reported during the 1995 World Series. He was unrepentant afterward: "The Indians wanted me to issue a statement of regret when the fine was announced, but I told them to take it out. I apologize for nothing." Eventually, Belle routinely refused to speak with the media whatsoever, explaining that players like Steve Carlton also did not interview and that he preferred to concentrate on baseball.

Journalist Buster Olney wrote:

It was taken as fact in baseball circles that Albert Belle was nuts.... He slurped coffee constantly and seemed to be in a perpetual caffeinated frenzy. Few escaped his wrath; on some days he would destroy the postgame buffet ... launching plates into the shower, and after one poor at-bat against Boston, he retreated to the visitors' clubhouse and took a bat to teammate Kenny Lofton's boombox. Belle preferred to have the clubhouse cold, below 60°F, and when one chilly teammate turned up the heat, Belle walked over, turned down the thermostat, and smashed it with his bat. His nickname, thereafter, was "Mr. Freeze." ... The Indians billed him $10,000 a year for the damage he caused in clubhouses on the road and at home, and tolerated his behavior only because he was an awesome slugger....

In 2001, following his retirement, New York Daily News' columnist Bill Madden wrote:

Sorry, there'll be no words of sympathy here for Albert Belle. He was a surly jerk before he got hurt and now he's a hurt surly jerk....He was no credit to the game. Belle's boorish behavior should be remembered by every member of the Baseball Writers' Association when it comes time to consider him for the Hall of Fame.

In his first year of Hall of Fame eligibility (2006), he garnered only 7.7% of the baseball writers' votes, missing election by an extremely wide margin. His vote total, though, was high enough to keep his name on the ballot for the following year. In 2007, he received only 19 votes (3.5%), knocking him off the ballot.

In retirement, Belle had his first encounter with the Cleveland Indians since leaving the club in 1996, during their 2012 spring training in Goodyear, Arizona, and was joined by former teammates Kenny Lofton, Sandy Alomar Jr., and Carlos Baerga. In spite of this, Belle declined both to attend the 20th-anniversary celebration of the 1995 World Series team in 2015 and the 2016 ceremony when he was inducted into the Indians team Hall of Fame.

== Legal troubles ==
In October 1995, Belle's house in Euclid, Ohio, was egged by teenagers after he turned away trick-or-treaters on Halloween. Belle chased one of the trick-or-treaters in his car. Belle was fined $100 for reckless operation of a vehicle. The guardian of the teenager later sued Belle for $850,000, contending that Belle's car had bumped into the teenager. The lawsuit was settled in 1997.

In 2006, Belle was sentenced to 90 days in jail and five years' probation after he admitted to stalking his former girlfriend, Christine Williams. He had placed a tracker under her car, and had placed calls making implied threats.

On March 25, 2018, Belle was arrested in Scottsdale, Arizona, and charged with indecent exposure and driving under the influence. All charges were dismissed the following month.

== Awards and accomplishments ==
College (LSU):

- First team All-SEC (1986, 1987)
- South 1 Regional Tournament MVP (1986)
- Second team All-America (1986)
- Third team All-America (1987)

Major League Baseball (Cleveland Indians, Chicago White Sox, Baltimore Orioles):

- AL home run leader (1995)
- AL RBI leader (1993, 1995-tied with Mo Vaughn, 1996)
- AL doubles leader (1995-tied with Edgar Martínez)
- AL runs leader (1995-tied with Edgar Martínez)
- AL slugging percentage leader (1995, 1998)
- AL outfield assist leader (RF) (1999-tie)
- Named to Silver Slugger team (1993, 1994, 1995, 1996, 1998)
- All-Star (1993, 1994, 1995, 1996, 1997)
- First player to ever hit 50 HR and 50 doubles (1995)
- The Sporting News Player of the Year (1995)
- Baseball Digest Player of the Year (1995)
- Led major leagues in the 1990s with 1,099 RBIs
- Led major leagues in extra-base hits in the 1990s with 711
- Fourth player ever to have eight straight seasons with 30 HR and 100 RBIs
- Inducted into the Louisiana Sports Hall of Fame (June 2005)
- AL leader in runs created (1998)
- AL leader in OPS+ (1998)
- AL leader in total bases (1994, 1995, 1998)

== Personal life ==
Belle's only sibling, fraternal twin brother Terry, was one of Albert's closest friends. Terry, who had an MBA, acted as Albert's public relations advisor, but couldn't frequently convince him to overcome perceived slights for the purpose of achieving PR benefits. Terry, who was Albert's teammate at LSU, passed away in 2011 at age 45 due to injuries sustained in a car accident.

Belle's parents were both schoolteachers as well as deacons in a church. He grew up highly religious, and excelled both academically as well as off the field. As a Boy Scout, he reached the level of Eagle Scout. In High School, he was a member of the National Honor Society as well as vice president of the local chapter of Future Business Leaders of America.

In 2005, after retiring from baseball, Belle married Melissa née Galus, a former television reporter. The couple has three daughters.

Even while earning well over $100 million in salary during his career, Belle was careful with his money. Both during and after his career, he gave time and money to charities.

== See also ==
- Cleveland Guardians award winners and league leaders
- List of Major League Baseball annual runs scored leaders
- List of Major League Baseball annual doubles leaders
- List of Major League Baseball career home run leaders
- List of Major League Baseball career OPS leaders
- List of Major League Baseball career putouts as a left fielder leaders
- List of Major League Baseball career runs batted in leaders
- List of Major League Baseball career slugging percentage leaders
- List of Major League Baseball doubles records
- List of people from Shreveport, Louisiana
- Louisiana Sports Hall of Fame

Awards and achievements
Preceded by Frank Thomas; Garret Anderson; Rafael Palmeiro; Derek Jeter; Rafael Palmeiro & Iván Rodríguez; Edgar Martínez	American League Player of the Month; June 1994; August & September 1995; July 1998; September 1998; September 1999; June 2000	Succeeded by Frank Thomas; Frank Thomas; Derek Jeter; Manny Ramírez; Jermaine Dye; Johnny Damon
