= Corked bat =

Illegally modified baseball bat

In baseball, a corked bat is a specially modified baseball bat that has been filled with cork or other less dense substances to make the bat lighter. A lighter bat gives a hitter a quicker swing and may improve the hitter's timing. Despite popular belief that corking a bat creates a "trampoline effect" which causes a batted ball to travel farther, physics researchers and the Mythbusters have shown this is not the case. In Major League Baseball, modifying a bat with foreign substances and using it in play is illegal and subject to ejection and further punishment.

== Construction ==
To cork a bat, a hole approximately 1/2 inch (13 mm) in diameter is drilled down through the thick end of the bat roughly 6 inches (150 mm) deep. Crushed cork, bouncy balls, sawdust, or other similar material is compacted into the hole and the end is typically patched up with glue and sawdust. However, this weakens the bat's structural integrity and makes it more susceptible to breakage, even more so if the cork is placed beyond six inches into the bat. Corked bats are sometimes discovered when they break during the moment of impact upon hitting a baseball.

== Major League Baseball ==
Using a corked bat in Major League Baseball is in violation of Rule 6.03 (a)(5), which states

A batter is out for illegal action when:

(5) He uses or attempts to use a bat that, in the umpire's judgment, has been altered or tampered with in such a way to improve the distance factor or cause an unusual reaction on the baseball. This includes bats that are filled, flat-surfaced, nailed, hollowed, grooved or covered with a substance such as paraffin, wax, etc.

It has been a popular belief that the material used to cork a bat creates a "trampoline effect", causing a ball hit with a corked bat to travel further than one hit with an uncorked bat. Research has shown this not to be the case. Another perceived advantage of using a corked bat is its effect on the bat's weight. Corking a bat causes it to be lighter, which in turn allows the batter to swing it more quickly. However, the reduction in weight negatively affects the velocity of the ball as it leaves the bat, effectively cancelling out the advantage gained from a quicker bat speed. A lighter bat can, however, create an advantage by letting the batter delay a swing for a fraction of a second, which would allow for more accuracy.

=== History of use ===
Since 1970, six players have been caught using corked bats. The following table summarizes these events:

Player	Team	Date	Suspension	Offense	Reason given	Ref.
Sammy Sosa	Chicago Cubs	June 3, 2003	Eight games	Corked bat	Bat was meant to only be used in batting practice	
Wilton Guerrero	Los Angeles Dodgers	June 1, 1997	Eight games, fined $1,000	Corked bat	None	
Chris Sabo	Cincinnati Reds	July 29, 1996	Seven games; Reds fined $25,000	Corked bat	Borrowed bat from unnamed teammate	
Albert Belle	Cleveland Indians	July 15, 1994	Seven games	Corked bat	None	
Billy Hatcher	Houston Astros	August 31, 1987	Ten days	Corked bat	Borrowed bat from pitcher (Dave Smith) meant only for batting practice	
Graig Nettles	New York Yankees	September 7, 1974	No suspension	Six super balls in bat	Received bat as a gift from a fan	

Nettles avoided a suspension after explaining that the bat was given to him by a fan. Hatcher had used a teammate's bat after his own shattered, and was backed up on that claim by his manager, Hal Lanier. Sabo also denied knowledge that his bat had been tampered with, moreover the bat audibly cracked on a foul ball before breaking, leading the broadcast crew to question whether Sabo would have knowingly risked continuing to use a cracked illegal bat. On the flip side, Guerrero chased bat pieces after his lumber shattered, a rather unusual reaction, and later admitted to using it intentionally the prior few months. Belle's teammates broke into the umpire's room and swapped the bat with an innocent one, but were caught doing so.

In addition, a number of former players have been accused of and/or admitted to using corked bats. Former Kansas City Royals star Amos Otis is one of them. Another is former player announcer, and National League president Bill White. Former player and Major League manager Phil Garner admitted in January 2010 on a Houston radio station that he used a corked bat against Gaylord Perry and "hit a home run" with it. Garner also admitted that the 2005 Houston Astros used corked bats during the 2005 MLB season and 2005 World Series of which he was the manager. In 2010, Deadspin reported that Pete Rose used corked bats during his 1985 pursuit of Ty Cobb's all-time hits record. Two sports memorabilia collectors who owned Rose's game-used bats from that season had the bats x-rayed and found the telltale signs of corking. Rose had previously denied using corked bats.

== See also ==
- Cheating in baseball
