= Sodfather =

Sodfather or the Sodfather may refer to:

- Roger Bossard (born 1949), American groundskeeper
- George Toma (born 1925), American groundskeeper
