= Scott Reifert =

American sports executive

Scott Reifert is the vice president of communications for the Chicago White Sox of Major League Baseball. He currently pens Inside the White Sox, the team's official blog.

He also serves as president of Chicago White Sox Charities.

He first joined the club in 1983.

In his current role, he oversees the club’s strategic communications efforts, media services, mass communications functions, public relations activities, community relations initiatives and the team’s Web site, whitesox.com.

A 1982 graduate of the University of Iowa, Reifert also has a master's degree in sports management from Western Illinois University. He is married to Amy Howley, head women’s soccer coach at the University of Chicago.
