= Terry Savarise =

Terry Savarise is the senior vice president of stadium operations for the Chicago White Sox major league baseball team. He is the executive responsible for all aspects of the operation of Rate Field, including the over 2,000 employees who staff the ballpark on game days.

Savarise directed the planning and construction of the ballpark, which opened in 1991. A phased, multi-year series of major renovations to the facility is currently underway.

Under Savarise’s leadership seating has been moved closer to the field of play, a popular "Fan Deck" was added in center field, and the entire color scheme of the ballpark was changed from whites and blues to dark greys and greens.

In a dramatic move that shocked and delighted fans, the team also removed the top eight rows of the ballpark’s upper deck and added a new roof over this portion of the stadium. Together, these changes had an enormous impact on fan perceptions of the facility; previously the ballpark was maligned for its perceived blandness, steep upper deck and lack of intimacy. Today, it is considered one of the finest sports facilities in North America.

== Other Achievements ==
Savarise also serves as Executive Vice President of Operations for the United Center, home of the Chicago Bulls and Chicago Blackhawks. Savarise was responsible for all design and construction aspects of this multipurpose arena. He also coordinated the installation and operation of the 1996 Democratic National Convention at the United Center.

Savarise spearheaded the design and construction of Tucson Electric Park, the White Sox spring training facility and stadium in Tucson, Arizona, which opened in the spring of 1998. He worked closely on the design and construction of Ed Smith Stadium in Sarasota, Florida, which served as the club’s spring training and minor league headquarters from 1989-97. In addition, he assisted in the development of L.P. Frans Stadium, home of the White Sox former Class A affiliate in Hickory, North Carolina.
