= Roger Bossard =

American groundskeeper

- Born: 1949 (age 76–77); Chicago, Illinois, United States
- Education: Purdue University
- Occupations: Groundskeeper for Chicago White Sox and Consultant for Major League Baseball
- Parent: Gene Bossard

Roger Bossard is the head groundskeeper at Rate Field, home of the Chicago White Sox.

Bossard joined the White Sox in 1967 working as an assistant to his father, Gene Bossard, and became the official head groundskeeper when his father retired in 1983. He is known amongst the industry as "The Sodfather" and is highly influential in the development of new ballparks. He is the longest-tenured groundskeeper in major-league history and has been with the Sox longer than any other employee. His grandfather Emil Bossard and uncle Marshall Bossard worked for years for the Indians and were inducted into the MLB Groundskeepers Hall of Fame. His father, Gene Bossard, was the Sox's head groundskeeper at old Comiskey from 1940 to ’83.

Nineteen of 30 major-league teams use a patented drainage system that Bossard developed for the opening of Rate Field in 1991, including Chase Field in Arizona, Comerica Park in Detroit, Miller Park in Milwaukee, Busch Stadium in St. Louis, T-Mobile Park in Seattle, Nationals Park in Washington, and both Chicago ballparks, including Wrigley Field, as well as spring training complexes for the Cincinnati Reds, the Montreal Expos, the New York Yankees, the St. Louis Cardinals, the Arizona Diamondbacks, the Los Angeles Dodgers, and the Chicago White Sox.

In 1984–85, Bossard designed and built the first natural turf soccer fields in Saudi Arabia for the royal family.

On Sunday, June 12, 2011, the Chicago White Sox gave out Bossard bobblehead dolls to the first 20,000 fans in attendance vs. the Oakland Athletics.
