= Centralia, Washington minor league baseball history =

Centralia, Washington minor league baseball teams
- 1903–1912; (1903–1904, 1911–1912); Centralia, Washington

Minor league affiliations
- Class: Class D (1903–1904, 1911–1912)
- League: Southwest Washington League (1903–1904); Washington State League (1911–1912)

Major league affiliations
- Team: None

Minor league titles
- League titles (1): 1911

Team data
- Name: Centralia Midgets (1903–1904); Centralia Pets (1911); Centralia Railroaders (1912)
- Ballpark: Riverside Park (1903–1904, 1911–1912)

Minor league baseball teams were based in Centralia, Washington in four seasons between 1903 and 1912. Centralia teams played as members of the Class D level Southwest Washington League in 1903 and 1904 and the Washington State League in 1911 and 1912, winning the 1911 league championship. Centralia teams hosted home minor league games at Riverside Park.

== History ==
Minor league baseball began in Centralia, Washington in 1903. The Centralia Midgets were charter members of the four–team Class D level Southwest Washington League. The Aberdeen Pippins, Hoquiam Perfect Gentlemen and Olympia Senators joined Centralia as charter members in league play.

Beginning play on May 10, 1903, the Centralia Midgets placed 2nd in the Southwest Washington League in their first season of play. In the league structure, Southwest Washington League teams played games six times per week, but only the weekend games were counted for the league standings. Centralia ended the season with a record of 7–11, playing under managers Paul Ruff and George Dysart. The Midgets finished 4.0 games behind Aberdeen and Hoquiam who tied for first place with 11–7 records, with Aberdeen awarded the championship when Hoquiam refused to participate in a playoff game. Ira Harmon of Centralia led the Southwest Washington League with both a batting average of .341 and 2 home runs.

Continuing Southwest Washington League play in 1904, Centralia finished in third place in the four–team league. The league continued the practice of only counting weekend games in the standings, while playing six times per week overall. Ending the season with a record of 6–12, Centralia played under managers Jack Bell and Bill Auerette. The Midgets finished 8.0 games behind the first place Hoquiam Perfect Gentlemen (14–4) in the final standings. The Centralia Midgets folded after the 1904 season, replaced by the Montesano Farmers in 1905 league play.

In 1911, minor league baseball resumed in Centralia. The Centralia Pets became members of the four–team Class D level Washington State League. The Chehalis Proteges, Raymond Venetians and South Bend River Rats joined Centralia in 1911 league play.

The 1911 Centralia Pets won the Washington State League championship. The Pets placed first in the final standings with a record of 38–17, playing under managers W.R. Patton and Guy Muck. Centralia finished 2.5 games ahead of the second place Chehalis Proteges (36–20) in the final standings, followed by the Raymond Venetians (25–29) and South Bend River Rats (11–44). Pitcher Ray Callahan, who split the season with Centralia and Chehalis led the Washington State League with both 13 total wins and 131 strikeouts.

In 1912, the Centralia "Railroaders" played their final minor league season, as the Washington State League folded during the season. The Aberdeen Black Cats folded from the league on July 10, 1912, causing the entire league to fold on July 14, 1912. When the season ended on July 14, 1912, the Centralia Railroaders were in second place with a 19–17 record. Playing under managers W.R. Patton and George Dysart, the Railroaders finished 3.5 games behind the first place Chehalis Farmers in the final standings. The Washington State League permanently folded following the 1912 season.

The Centralia use of the "Railroaders" moniker ties to local industry and history. Opening in 1912, the Centralia Union Station was constructed by the Northern Pacific Railway. Continuing today as an Amtrak stop, passenger rail service began in Centralia, Washington in 1880.

Centralia, Washington has not hosted another minor league team.

== The ballpark ==
The Centralia minor league teams hosted minor league home games at Riverside Park. The ballpark was located on Lowe Street off of Harrison Avenue, Centralia, Washington. The site today remains home to "Rotary Riverside Park," which is still in use as a public park.

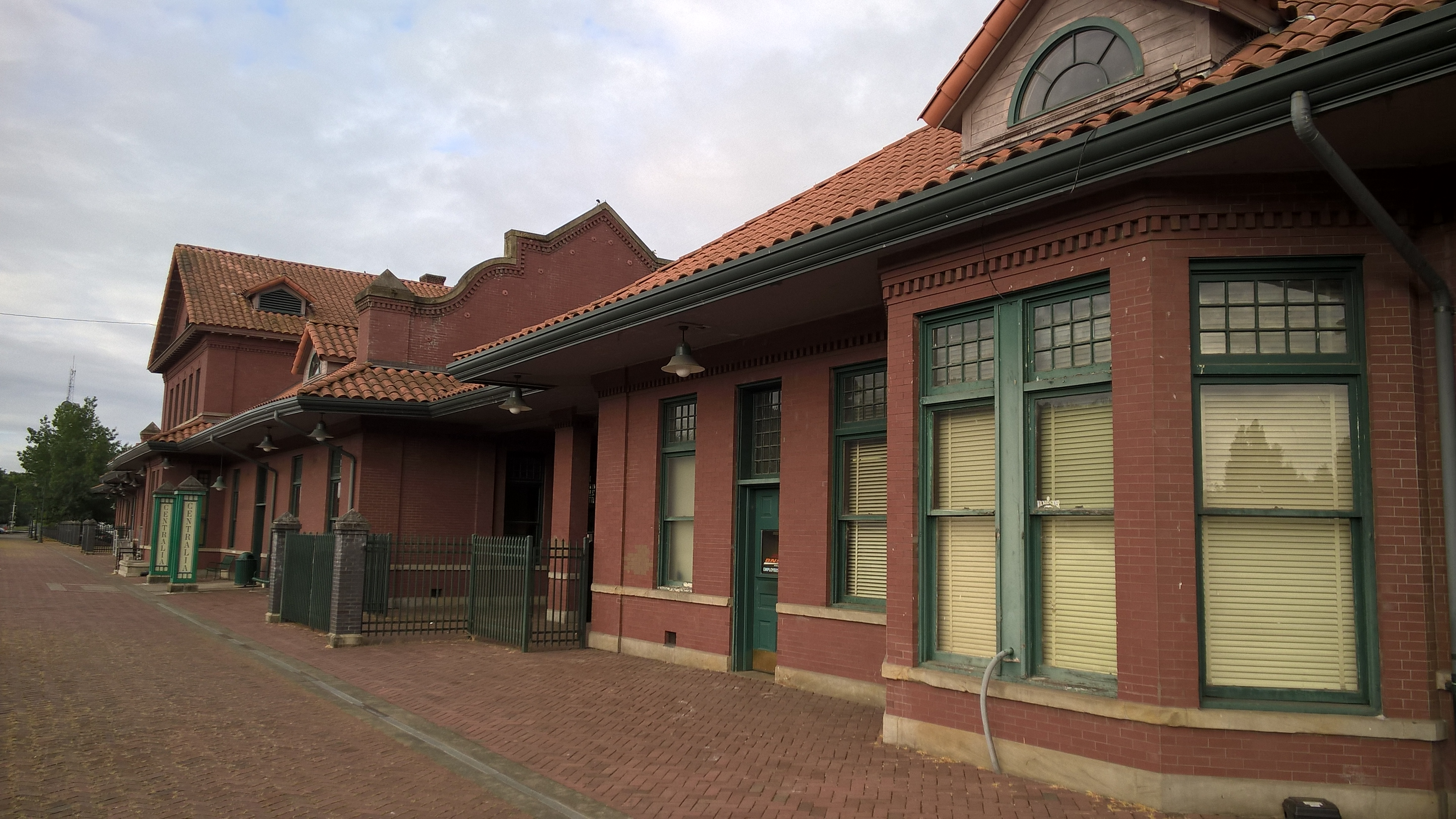
(2016) Centralia Union Depot. National Register of Historic Places. Centralia, Washington

== Timeline ==
Year(s)	# Yrs.	Team	Level	League	Ballpark
1903–1904	2	Centralia Midgets	Class D	Southwest Washington League	Riverisde Park
1911	1	Centralia Pets	Class D	Washington State League	Riverisde Park
1912	1	Centralia Railroaders	Class D	Washington State League	Riverisde Park

== Year-by-year records ==
Year	Record	Finish	Manager	Playoffs/Notes
1903	7–11	2nd	Paul Ruff / George Dysart	No playoffs held
1904	6–12	3rd	Jack Bell / Bill Auerette	No playoffs held
1911	38–17	1st	W.R. Patton / Guy Muck	League champions
1912	19–17	2nd	W.R. Patton / George Dysart	League folded July 14

== Notable alumni ==
- Ed Bruyette (1903)
- Ray Callahan (1911)
- Jack Roche (1911)
