= Millett Field =

Public park in Chehalis, Washington, US

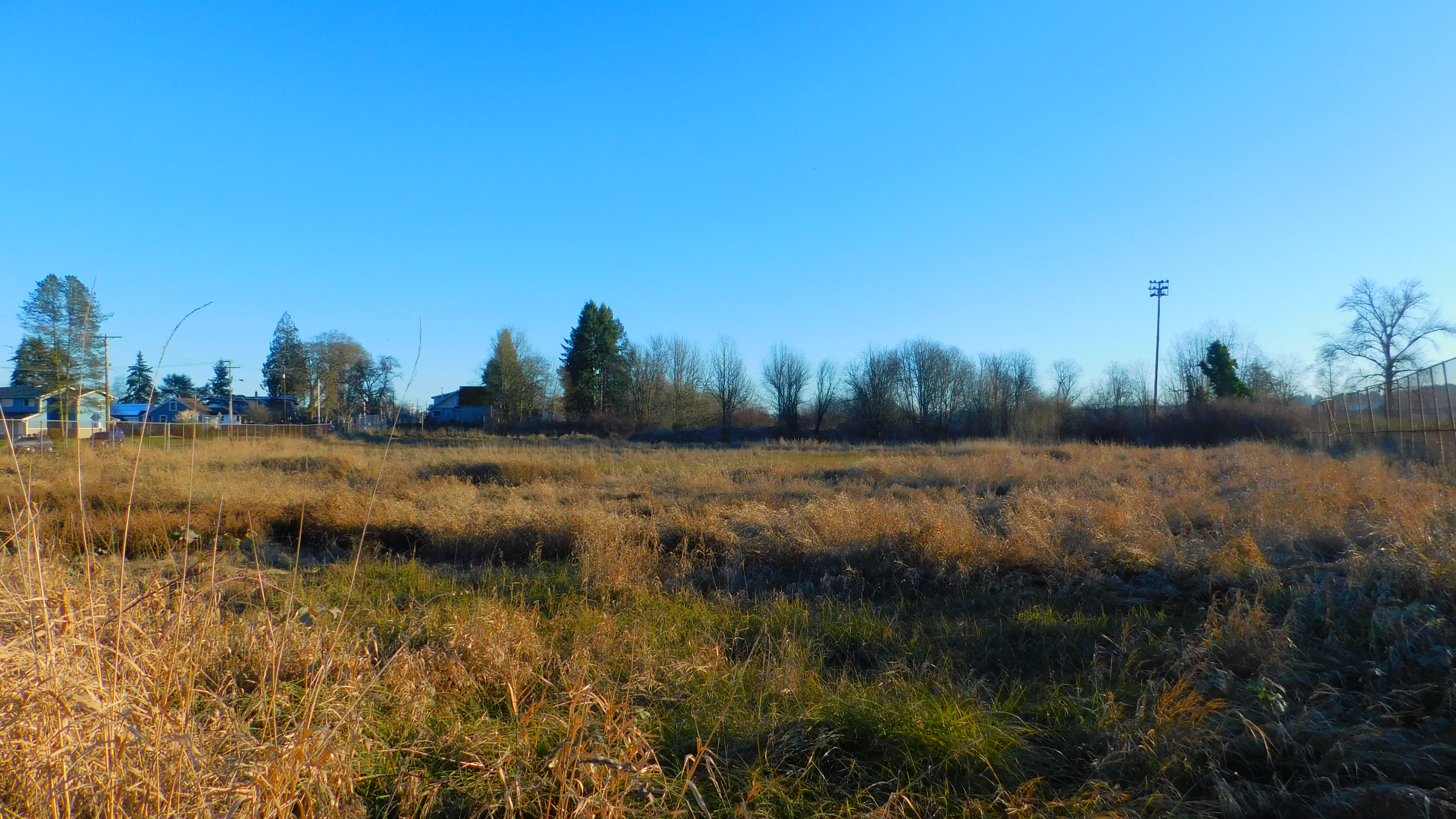
- Millett Field, Chehalis, 2022

- Location within Washington (state)
- Type: Athletics, playground
- Location: Chehalis, Washington
- Coordinates: 46°39′20″N 122°58′02″W
- Area: 3.3-acre (1.3 ha)
- Designated: 1898, grand opening 1908
- Closed: Ballfield dismantled, 1979; fenced off, mid-1990s
- Founder: Daniel Millett
- Owner: City of Chehalis
- Open: Access to courts and playground only
- Terrain: Flat
- Facilities: None

Millett Field, also as Millet Field, (Note: Early reporting about the field would often spell the name with one "T", however it is documented that the correct spelling is "Millett".) is the oldest, continuously used public park in Chehalis, Washington and is most noted as home to a Chehalis minor-league baseball team in the early 20th century. The ballfield was regularly used as the central hub of Chehalis sporting activity for decades, including hosting games for several Negro League teams in the 1920s. Located one block north of the NRHP-listed O. B. McFadden House, the 3.3-acre (1.3 ha) park began in 1898 with an official opening in 1908.

== History ==
Millett Field began as a land donation to the city in 1898 from its namesake, Daniel Millett, a notable attorney and prior mayor of the city. After deeding the parcel, originally a business share of the Chehalis Land & Timber Company, Millett bought several surrounding tracts to increase the park's size. Instructions written in the original deed require the park to be used for "athletic and playground recreation types of activities".

=== Early years (1898–1907) ===
The park was kept in an undeveloped state by the city however residents used the land for local baseball games, including amateur competitions sponsored by local businesses. The earliest sporting event on the grounds, a baseball game, was recorded in 1896, with large crowds in attendance reported through the remainder of the 1890s.

The first recorded football game played at the park between the Chehalis and Centralia high schools, colloquially known as the "Swamp Cup" or "Thanksgiving Day Game", was in 1907. The Chehalis team hosted the Swamp Cup from 1907 to 1915, then every other year until the early 1930s; Chehalis never lost a football match to Centralia at Millett Field. Millett Field was used as home turf for the Chehalis Bearcat's football team until 1932, moving to new grounds after flooding issues and the loss of the grandstand prohibited large crowds from attending the games.

=== Professional baseball era (1908–1949) ===
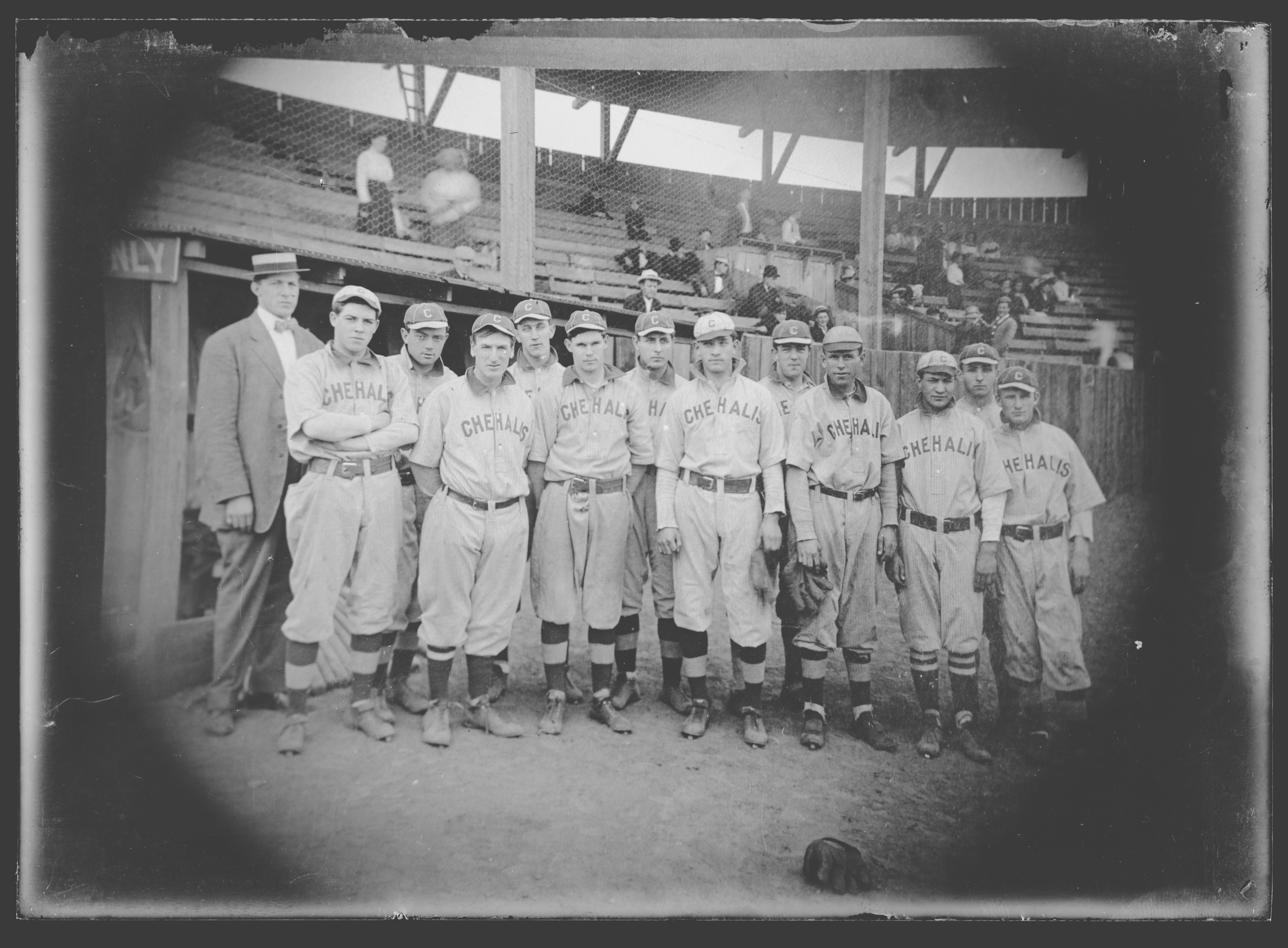
Chehalis baseball team, c. 1910

An official grand opening took place on May 9, 1908, with a parade and two baseball games between the city of Chehalis and Centralia. (Note: Chehalis won both baseball games on the 1908 opening weekend by scores of 4-2 and 10-6.) A grandstand had been built but a roof had not yet been constructed over the bleacher section. The dedication was declared a public holiday in the city. In 1910, the field became host to the Chehalis Gophers baseball team after the establishment of the Class D level Washington State League minor league. The team finished second in the six-team league, led by retired Chicago White Sox ballplayer, Fielder Jones. The team was named the "Proteges" in 1911, finishing second. Before the opening game against Centralia at Millett Field, the city shut down and a large parade was held. The 1912 season featured the team as the "Farmers", winning the Washington State League championship by ending the season in 1st place. The city, and the ballfield, has not hosted another minor league team since. A six-team league was attempted in 1914 but did not materialize. For the remainder of the 1910s, the field was used primarily by the school district and by 1919 the city's park commissioner, prominent Chehalis funeral businessman L.J. Sticklin, remarked that "the days of minor league baseball are apparently passed".

The ballpark hosted the Timber League beginning in 1924, an independent and semi-pro baseball circuit that prior to its incorporation went under other monikers, such as the Southwest Washington League and the Lumber League. These semi-pro leagues began in the 1910s after the loss of the city's minor league team; the Timber League lasted until 1949. The first Chehalis Timber League baseball team, a reorganized club from Kelso during the 1926 mid-season, was known as the Timber Wolves; future teams were named after various mascots during this time, most notably, "Moose". Organized team competitions included the Chehalis Twilight Baseball league, the American Legion league, and a Chehalis Softball league. The largest recorded crowd at the field during this period was a Chehalis Bearcats football win over Hoquiam in an annual Armistice Day game in 1929.

The first Negro League team to play at the ballfield was in 1914 when the Colored Giants of Chicago played the Portland Colts. Negro League teams, most notably the Colored Giants of Tacoma, competed at Millett Field throughout the 1920s. Barnstorming clubs, such as the Cuban House of David, and the House of David Bearded Beauties, played at Millett Field.

During the late 1920s and into the 1930s, an annual baseball competition was held at Millett Field between the Portland and Seattle teams of the Pacific Telephone & Telegraph Company. A championship cup, for a time sponsored by the St. Helens Hotel, was awarded to the winner.

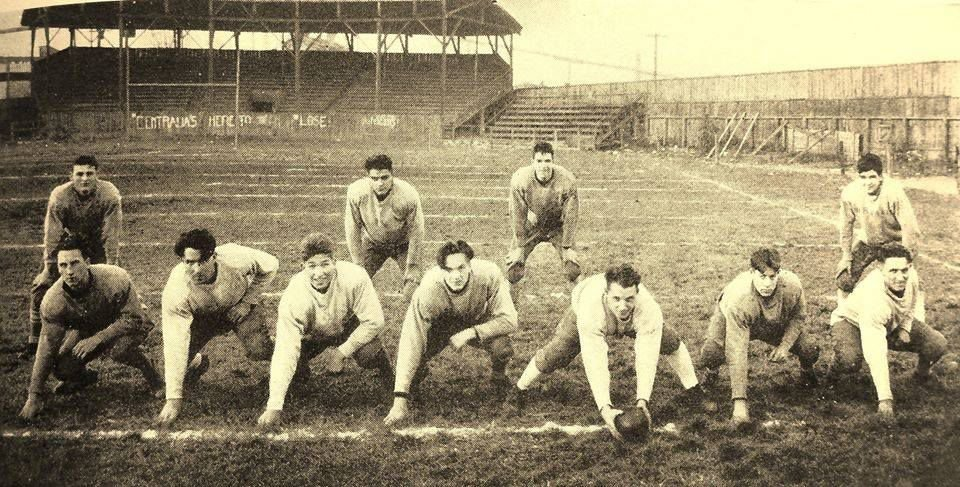
Chehalis High School football team, c. 1920

The park was used for more than baseball and football. The outfield was temporarily converted for track and field events in the 1910s and 1920s. Concrete tennis courts were built in the southeast section of the park in 1925 with financing provided by a local Business and Professional Women's Club. Various non-athletic events, such as military training, national and local celebrations, festivals, carnivals, and early Decoration Day observances were held at Millett Field since its grand opening. The field was often as a takeoff or landing strip for airplane exhibitions and stunts in the 1920s, often coinciding with July 4 celebrations or Chautauqua events. Gustav Stromer, an early Washington state aviator, used Millett Field to launch a biplane in 1914. Crashing on his first attempt, the repaired airplane was able to achieve flight on a second bid from the park.

The football field was permanently moved to the south of the grounds away from the baseball diamond in 1925, providing annual savings and maintenance due to the necessary conversions of the two sports. Windstorms caused repeated damages to the ballpark, with a fence repair in 1930 and the decimation of the grandstand by a strong windstorm in 1932; the grandstand suffered a total loss of the roof and severe damage to the seating area. It was rebuilt in 1935, funded in part by local dances held to raise monies for the project. In 1936, flood lighting that was paid for by the softball league was installed at Millett Field, becoming the first ballpark in Southwest Washington to have a lighted field.

=== Local ballpark years (1950–1979) ===
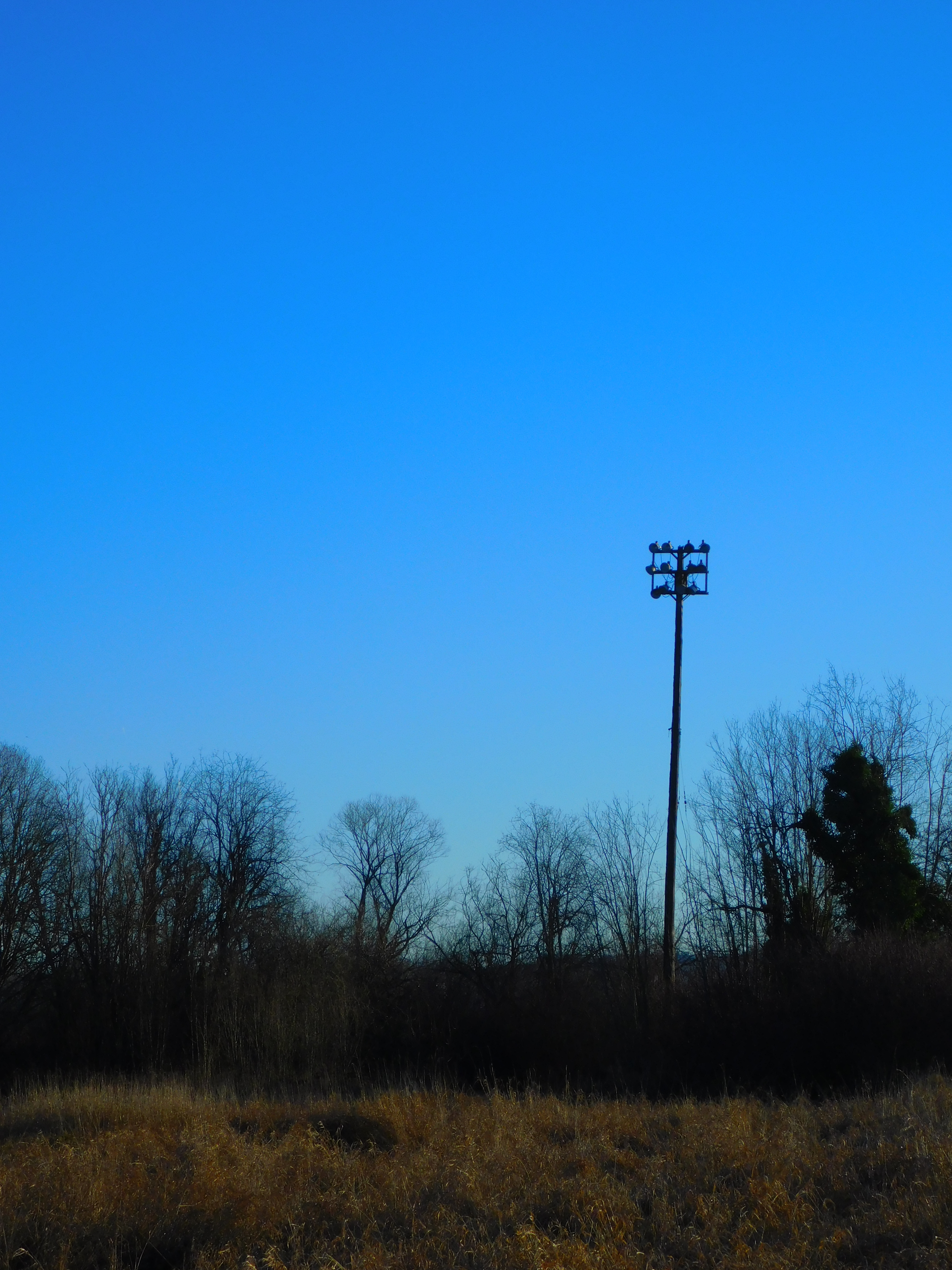
The last remaining light tower at Millett Field, 2022

A demand for stronger lighting at the ballpark began in earnest after the flood lights were erected in 1936. Despite continuing community efforts to raise funds, headway on the project did not emerge until 1952 when poles for the lighting were installed. The completed lighting of the field was celebrated with a dedication program in July 1953 after a strong final push to gather proceeds to complete the task. The Chehalis Bearcat high school baseball team played their first night game at the field in May 1954 against crosstown rivals, the Centralia Tigers. Despite the popularity of the ballpark, it was often plagued by flooding, being underwater especially in 1954 and 1961, as well as notoriously known for large quantities of mosquitos.

After the closing of the Timber League, baseball competitions were still held at the park into the 1970s, including amateur and semi-pro leagues, a local Babe Ruth League, girls' softball, and high school district tournaments. A Timber League revival began in 1954 though no further league games were played at the ballpark after the late 1950s. A new fence was built in 1958 and deemed too close to home plate, with eleven home runs hit in just one week's worth of semi-pro games.

Due to a railroad strike, Millett Field hosted the 1956 Northwest Regional Babe Ruth tournament that was originally planned to be held in Cheyenne, Wyoming. The stadium was overhauled in two days to provide an electric scoreboard, additional bleachers, and preventative measures against non-paying spectators from viewing the games. A team representing Portland, Oregon won the championship, led by future Major League All-Star, Mickey Lolich.

=== Closure and repurpose (1979–present) ===
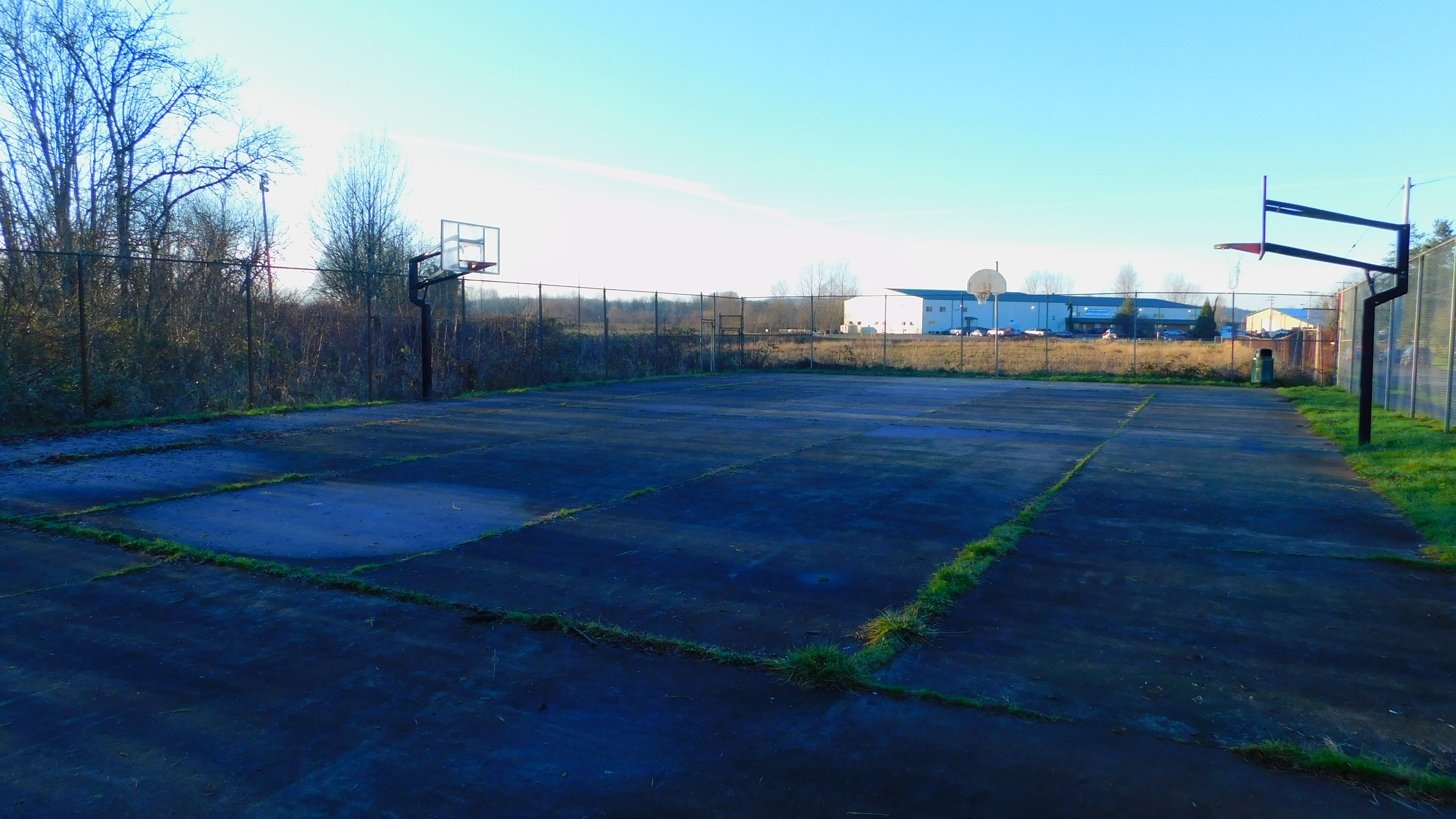
Basketball courts, 2022

After the construction of ballfields at Recreation Park (1954) and Stan Hedwall Park (1972) in Chehalis, use of Millett Field began to decline. The grandstand and bleachers, rotting and "becoming a public hazard", were taken down in 1979 and the playing field eventually grew over. The ballfield area was fenced off and officially closed in the mid-1990s during an ecological cleanup of a nearby factory and the surrounding area. Due to a flood in November 1986, approximately 10,000 gallons of pentachlorophenol, a protentional carcinogenic chemical used in the process of treating lumber, was leaked into the field and nearby neighborhood. The remediation was completed in 1996.

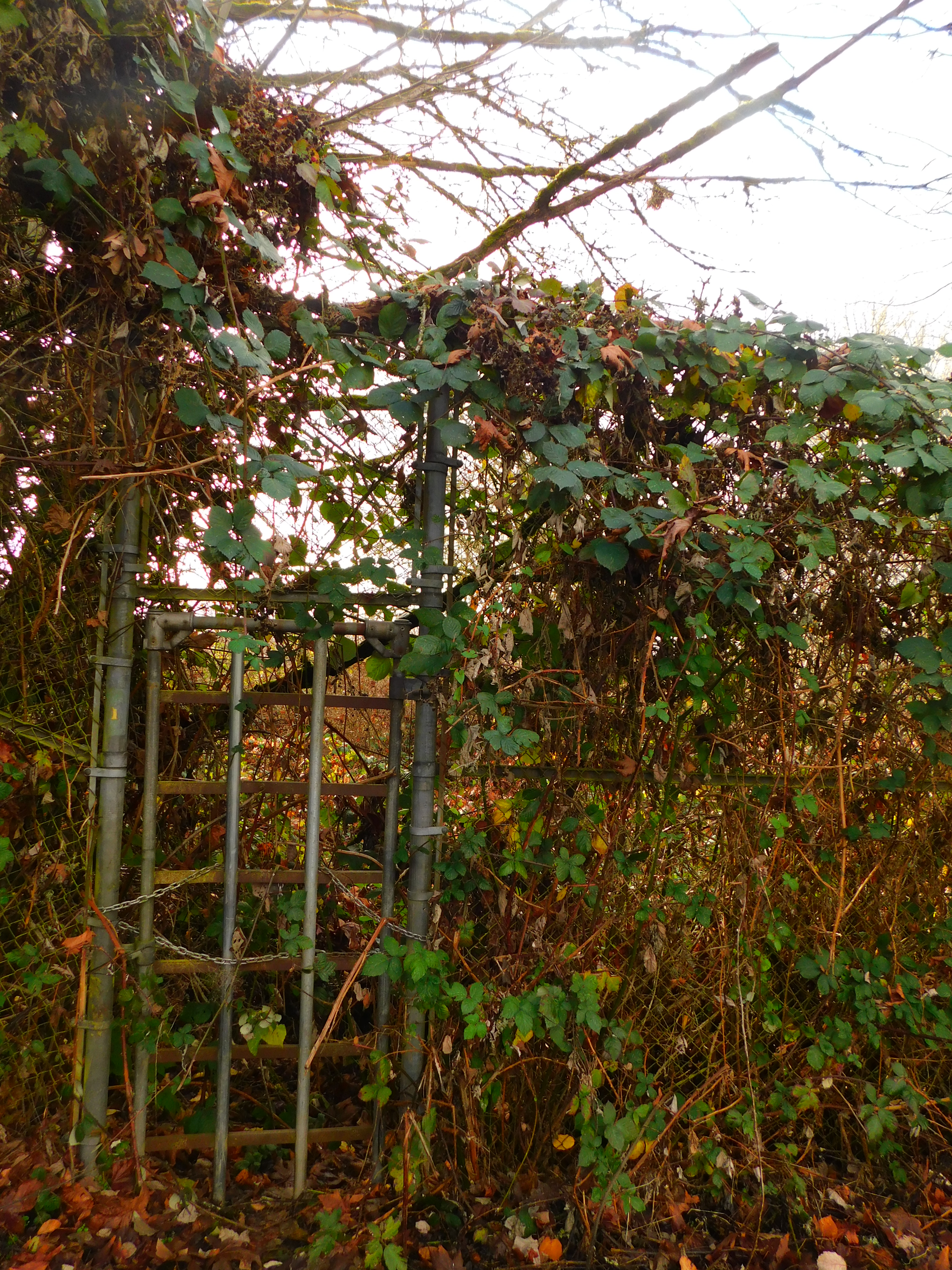
Gate, barring entrance to original tennis court area, 2025

The tennis courts became unkempt and an unauthorized but tolerated skate park was built on the concrete pads but was eventually removed in 2001. Nearby residents raised funds to convert the tennis courts to a fenced basketball court in the early 2000s, completing the project in 2004. An attempt in 2006 to consider the land surplus for use as a flood mitigation tool did not materialize, however a playground area, built with the cooperation of a local fitness club and the city was unveiled that year.

A plaque on the tennis court enclosure, and one remaining light pole, are the only visible reminders of the field's baseball past.

In 2026, the court was cleaned and updated under an Eagle Scout renovation project led by a Life Scout from Chehalis Troop 373, Carter Culletto. The efforts included repairing cracks, replacing a broken basketball hoop, and removing overgrowth. The space was resurfaced, painted black and red, and new lines were added for the basketball court and for the inclusion of two pickleball areas.

== Geography ==
Millett Field, listed at 3.3-acre (1.3 ha), is located in Chehalis, Washington, one block north of the O. B. McFadden House, a residence listed on the National Register of Historic Places.

== Features ==
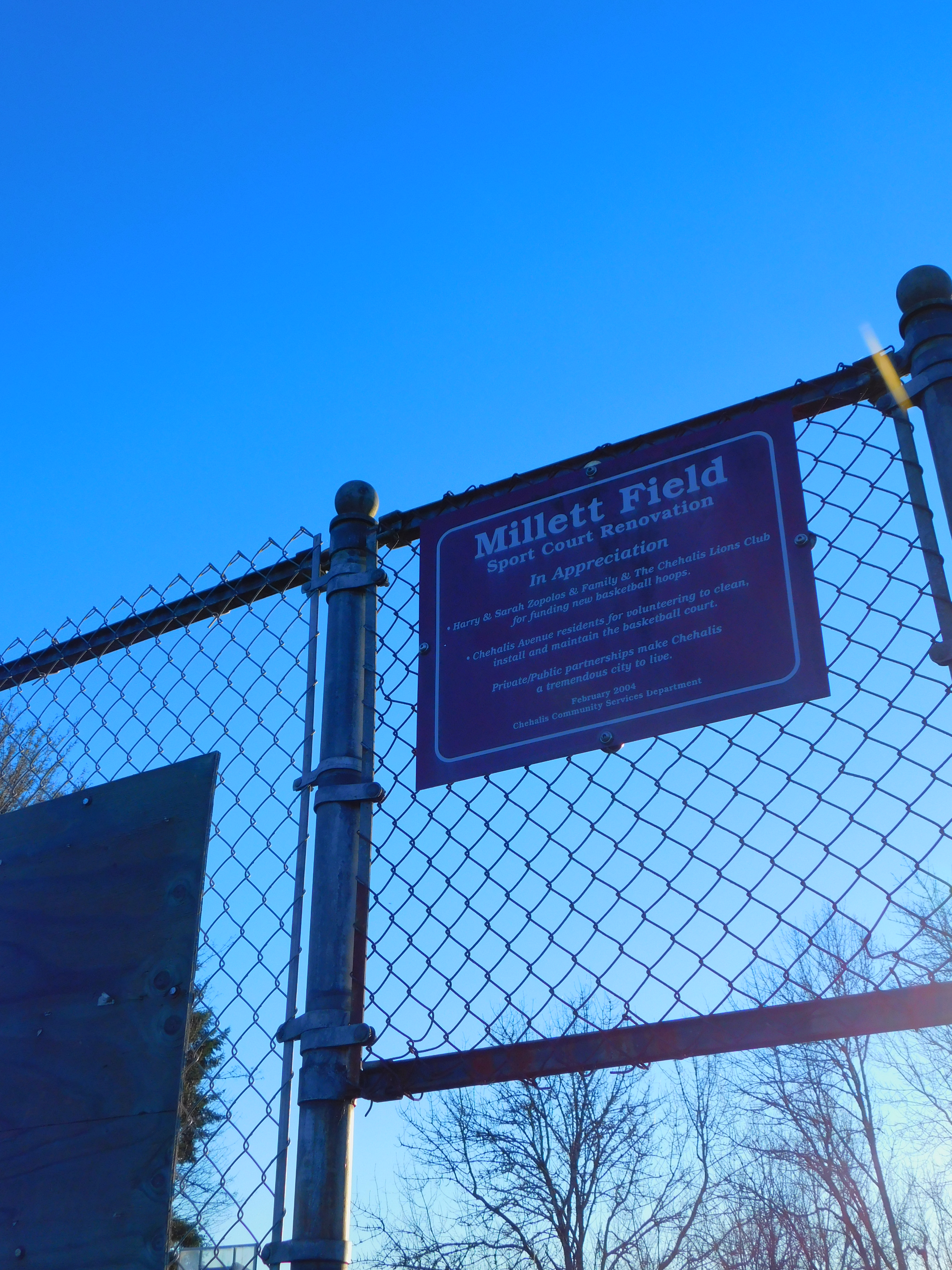
Tennis court conversion, 2022

Millett Field's home plate was positioned in the northern corner of the ballpark, with the Crossarm Mill factory, the downtown core, and Park Hill behind the grandstand. The outfield fence, at points in time temporary in placement until made permanent in 1958, ran parallel to the train tracks. Behind center field was a small forest of trees and left field abutted the tennis courts.

Millett Field had a grandstand with accompanying bleachers and the park was surrounded by a wooden fence. Three thousand people could attend ballgames when the park was first constructed, with 1,000 people able to sit in the grandstand, 500 in the bleachers, and an additional 1,500 around the fence line. The bleachers were expanded in 1930 to seat an additional 500 more spectators and the rebuilt grandstand of 1935, though smaller in capacity than the previous stand, accommodated up to six hundred spectators. The grandstand was refurbished a final time in 1960.

The park, as of 2022, is enclosed in a chain link fence. The old ballfield area is closed to all visitors, with the basketball courts and playground portion the only accessible points to Millett Field. The last remaining light pole stands in a grove of trees in the southwest corner, near where the ballfield's center field was located.

== Notable ballplayers ==
- Woody Jensen, former Pittsburgh Pirate, played as a member of an early 1920s Chehalis Timber League team

== See also ==
- Chehalis Gophers
- Chehalis Gophers players
- Parks and recreation in Chehalis, Washington - for additional information on other baseball/softball fields in the city
