= South Bend River Rats =

- 1911; South Bend, Washington

Minor league affiliations
- Class: Class D (1911)
- League: Washington State League (1911)

Major league affiliations
- Team: None

Minor league titles
- League titles (0): None

Team data
- Name: South Bend River Rats (1911)
- Ballpark: Unknown (1911)

The South Bend River Rats were a minor league baseball team based in South Bend, Washington. In 1911, the South Bend River Rats played as members of the Class D level Washington State League in their only season of play, finishing last in the four-team league standings.

== History ==
Minor league baseball began in South Bend, Washington in 1911. The South Bend "River Rats" became members of the four–team Class D level Washington State League. The Centralia Pets, Chehalis Proteges and Raymond Venetians joined South Bend in 1911 league play, as the league reduced from six teams to four. The 1910 Aberdeen Black Cats, Montesano Farmers, Hoquiam Loggers and Tacoma Cubs franchises did not return to league play in 1911, as the Centralia and South Bend franchises joined Chehalis and Raymond.

South Bend's "River Rats" nickname corresponds to local geography. South Bend, Washington sits on Willapa Bay and along the Willapa River.

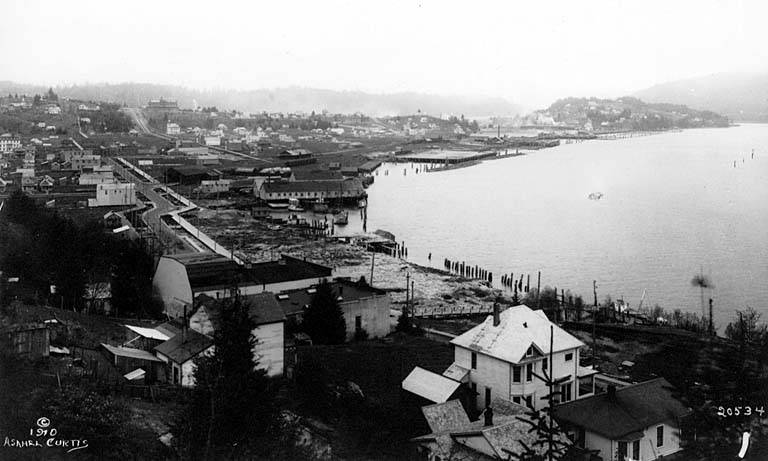
(1910) South Bend, Washington

Beginning play on May 6, 1911, the South Bend River Rats finished last in the Washington State League final standings. The River Rats placed fourth in the final standings with a record of 11–44, finishing 27.0 games behind the first place Centralia Pets. In the final league standings Centralia (38–17) finished 2.5 games ahead of the second place Chehalis Proteges (36–20) to win the championship, they both were followed by the Raymond Venetians (25–29) and South Bend River Rats (11–44). Ted Reed of South Bend won the Washington State League batting title, hitting .333.

The South Bend River Rats folded following the 1911 season, replaced in the four–team 1912 Washington State League by the Hoquiam Cougars. The league permanently folded during the 1912 season.

South Bend, Washington has not hosted another minor league team.

== The ballpark ==
The name of the 1911 South Bend River Rats' home minor league ballpark is not directly referenced. South Bend High School facilities were in use during the era. The high school building was founded in 1891 and the original building sat on a hill, accessible only by trail.

== Year-by-year record ==
| Year | Record | Finish | Manager | Playoffs/Notes |
|---|---|---|---|---|
| 1911 | 11–44 | 4th | NA | No playoffs held |

== Notable alumni ==
- Ted Reed (1911)
