= Olympia Senators =

- 1903–1906; Olympia, Washington

Minor league affiliations
- Class: Class D (1903–1906)
- League: Southwest Washington League (1903–1906)

Major league affiliations
- Team: None

Minor league titles
- League titles (0): None

Team data
- Name: Olympia Senators (1903–1906)
- Ballpark: Athletic Stadium (1903–1906)

The Olympia Senators were a minor league baseball team based in Olympia, Washington. From 1903 to 1906, the Senators teams played exclusively as members of the Class D level Southwest Washington League for the duration or the league. The Senators hosted home minor league games at Athletic Stadium, which was nicknamed "Electric Park."

== History ==
Minor league baseball began in Olympia, Washington in 1903. The Olympia "Senators" were charter members of the four–team Class D level Southwest Washington League. The Aberdeen Pippins, Centralia Midgets and Hoquiam Perfect Gentlemen joined Olympia as charter members in beginning league play.

1903 was the first season of the National Association governing body of minor league baseball. The Southwest Washington League and teams were designated to be Class D by the National Association, with John P. Fink, of Olympia serving as league president. The Olympia franchise was officially formed in February 1903, after 20 Olympia businessmen submitted the $250 league entry fee and gained league approval.

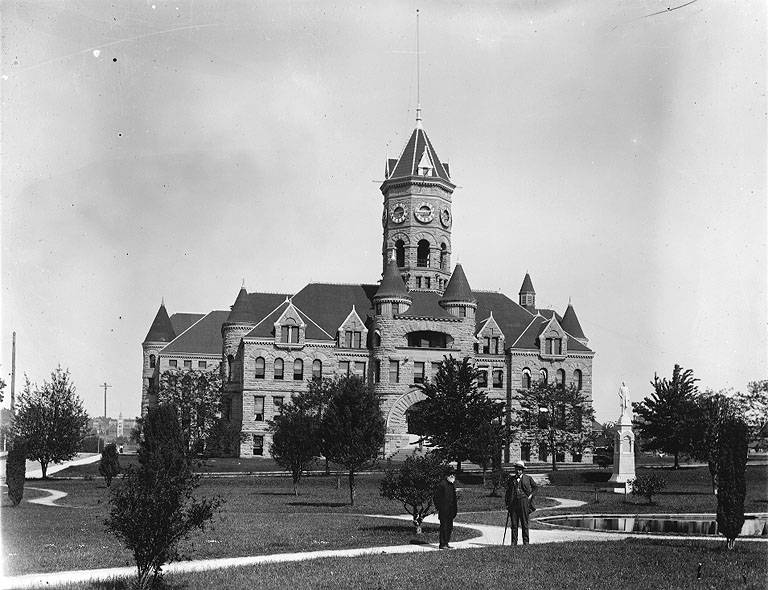
(1906) Old State Capitol Building. National Register of Historic Places. Olympia, Washington

The team's "Senators" nickname corresponds to Olympia, Washington being the state capitol of Washington.

Olympia played an opening home exhibition game on April 19, 1903, against the Tacoma Athletes, an amateur team. Olympia won 4–1 with 600 in attendance. Newspapers also referred to the 1903 Olympia team as the "Maroons," likely a reference to uniform colors, common in the era.

On May 22, 1903, President Theodore Roosevelt was present for an Aberdeen home game against Olympia for a "President Day" afternoon game. Olympia defeated the Pippins in the contest.

After beginning regular season play on May 10, 1903, the Olympia Senators placed second in the Southwest Washington League in their first season of play. In the league structure, Southwest Washington League teams played games six times per week, but only weekend games were counted for the league standings. Olympia ended the season with a record of 7–11, playing under managers Sam Fink and Charles Grant. Olympia finished 4.0 games behind Aberdeen and Hoquiam who tied for first place with 11–7 records, with Aberdeen awarded the championship when Hoquiam refused to participate in a playoff game.

Continuing Southwest Washington League play in 1904, the Olympia Senators finished in third place in the four–team league. The league continued the practice of only counting weekend games in the standings, while playing six times per week overall. Ending the season with a record of 6–12, Olympia played under managers Dave Edwards and Bill Hanlon. The Senators finished 8.0 games behind the first place Hoquiam Perfect Gentlemen (14–4) in the final standings.

In early May 1905, the local paper, The Morning Olympian introduced the Olympia players as if they were elected Senators: "Senator Cook, Senator Christian, Senator Almost, Senator Dye. A newly elected member who represents the Solid South is Senator Autray...."

The 1905 Olympia Senators placed second in the Southwest Washington League standings. The Southwest Washington League continued as a four–team league, as the Centralia Midgets were replaced by the Montesano Farmers in 1905 league play. The Southwest Washington League continued with counting only weekend games for the league standings. Olympia had a final record of 20–16, playing under manager James Mitchell. Montesano won the league championship, with Olympia 5.0 games behind.

The Southwest Washington League played a 1906 season as a Class D level league with Olympia, the Aberdeen Pippins and Hoquiam Loggers as the three league members referenced. Team and individual records, statistics and rosters for the 1906 season are unknown.

Olympia attempted to field a franchise in the 1910 Washington State League but were unsuccessful. The "Olympia Senators" played as a local semi–professional team into the 1920s.

Olympia, Washington has not hosted another minor league team.

== The ballpark ==
The Olympia Senators hosted minor league home games at a ballpark called Athletic Stadium and nicknamed "Electric Park." In 1903, the Olympia Light and Power company used timbers from a defunct velodrome to build the grandstand and bleachers at the ballpark site in time for the park to host games to begin the season. 1903, admission prices to an Olympia ballgame were .25 cents to enter the park, plus an additional .25 cents for a grandstand seat. Ladies were admitted free to the grandstand seating. The ballpark was situated along the Olympia Light and Power streetcar line and was located in the Carlyon neighborhood of Olympia. Today, the ballpark site is residential.

== Timeline ==
Year(s)	# Yrs.	Team	Level	League	Ballpark
1903–1906	4	Olympia Senators	Class D	Southwest Washington League	Athletic Stadium

== Year-by-year records ==
Year	Record	Finish	Manager	Playoffs/Notes
1903	7–11	2nd	Sam Fink / Charles Grant	No playoffs held
1904	6–12	3rd	Dave Edwards / Bill Hanlon	No playoffs held
1905	20–16	2nd	James Mitchell	No playoffs held

== Notable alumni ==
- Bob Blewett (1903)
- Bill Hanlon (1904, MGR)
- Ike Rockenfield (1903)
- Con Starkel (1903)

== See also ==
Olympia Senators players
