= Chehalis Gophers =

- 1910–1912; Chehalis, Washington

Minor league affiliations
- Class: Class D (1910–1912)
- League: Washington State League (1910–1912)

Major league affiliations
- Team: None

Minor league titles
- League titles (1): 1912

Team data
- Name: Chehalis Gophers (1910); Chehalis Proteges (1911); Chehalis Farmers (1912)
- Ballpark: Millett Field (1910–1912)

The Chehalis Gophers was the first nickname of the minor league baseball teams based in Chehalis, Washington. From 1910 to 1912, the Chehalis Gophers (1910), Chehalis "Proteges" (1911) and Chehalis "Farmers" teams played exclusively as members of the Class D level Washington State League, winning the 1912 league championship in the final season of the league.

The Chehalis teams were known by a different nickname each season and hosted home minor league games at Millett Field.

== History ==
Minor league baseball began in Chehalis, Washington in 1910, when the Chehalis "Gophers" became charter members of the six–team Class D level Washington State League. The Aberdeen Black Cats, Hoquiam Loggers, Montesano Farmers, Raymond Cougars and Tacoma Cubs teams joined Chehalis as beginning league play on May 10, 1910.

On March 6, 1910, the Washington State League was organized in at a meeting held in Hoquiam, Washington. At the meeting, Walter A. MacFarlane was elected league president and W. E. Campbell was elected vice president. The league was structured as a six–team league, playing a 21-week schedule. The franchises voted to split the shares of tickets equally between the home and away teams. Ten percent of the ticket earnings were to be given to the league for travel expenses. During the 1910 season, the salary cap was set, with a limit of $850.00 per month per team.

The month before the Gophers began their inaugural season, during an era in which organized baseball was segregated, the ballclub's ownership hosted a team fundraiser at the Chehalis Glide Theater (1910) by putting on a two-day minstrel show. The performance raised $200 for the team and included several Gopher ballplayers.

Beginning Washington State League play, the Chehalis Gophers placed second in the final standings in their first season of play. Chehalis ended the season with a record of 35–19, playing the season under managers Fred Neghring and Thomas Kelly. The Gophers finished 1.0 game behind the first place Raymond Cougars (37–19) in the final standings. A late addition to the team, Fielder Jones of Chehalis won the Washington State League batting title, with a batting average of .358 playing in 37 games.

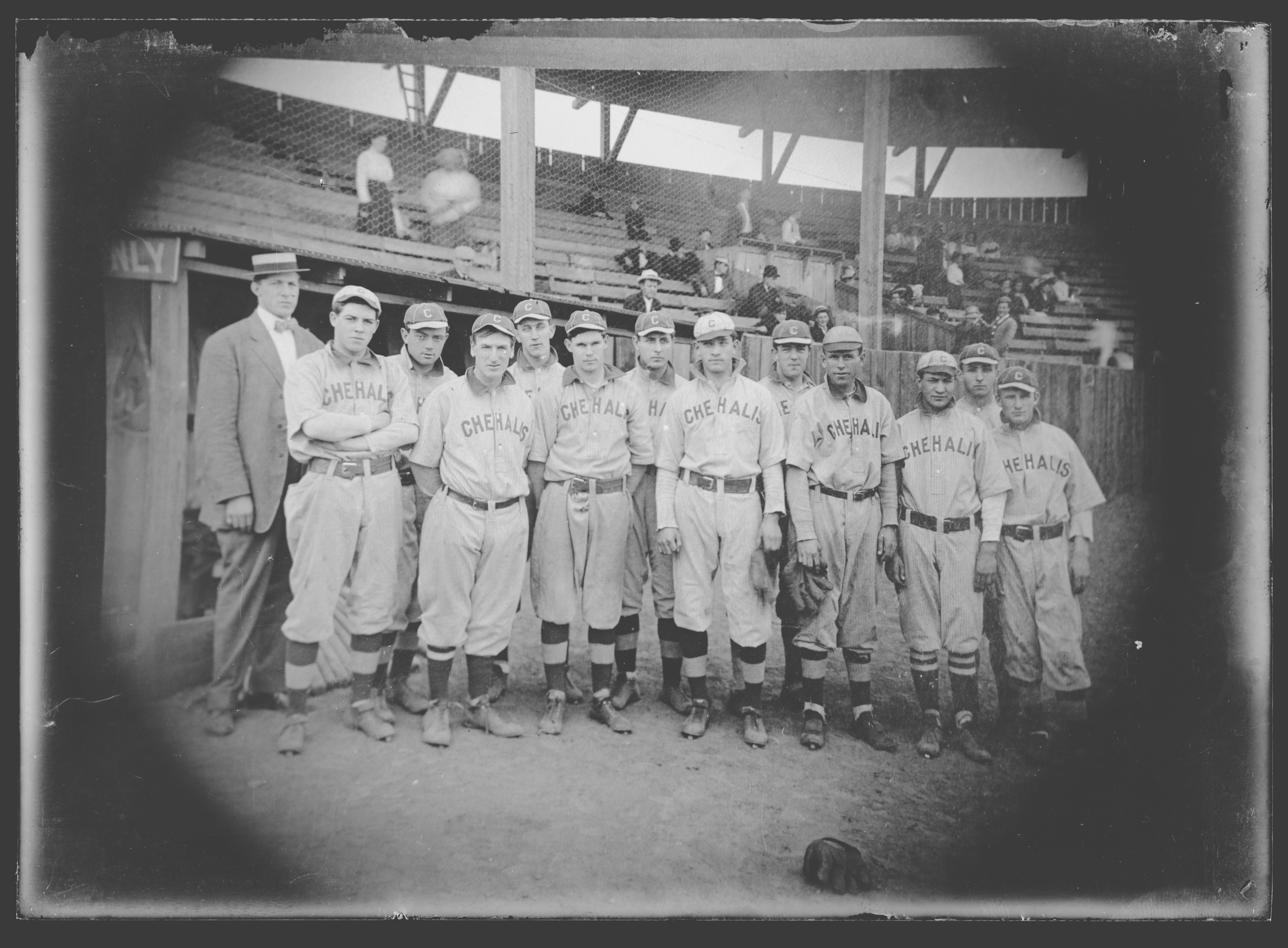
Chehalis baseball team, ca. 1910

Coming out of retirement to play for the Gophers, Fielder Jones was still the property of the Chicago White Sox and reportedly needed permission from White Sox owner Charles Comiskey to play in Chehalis. Jones had been player/manager when White Sox won the 1906 World Series. Jones joined the Chehalis team and reportedly agreed to play for no salary. Jones was needed after the Gophers' player/manager Fred Neghring was allegedly stabbed by player Tamp Osborn on the team train. Neghring was unable to play effectively after the stabbing. Osborn was reportedly jailed after the event. Playing for the Missoula team in Montana in 1911, Osborn was allegedly involved in another knife incident at a Missoula, Montana restaurant in July 1911.

In 1911, the Chehalis Proteges continued play as the Washington State League reduced franchises and became a four–team league. The Centralia Pets, Raymond Venetians and South Bend River Rats joined Chehalis in continuing 1911 league play.

The 1911 Chehalis Proteges were again runner–ups in the Washington State League. The Proteges placed second in the final standings with a record of 36–20, playing under managers Dusty Miller and Lenny Taylor. Chehalis finished 2.5 games behind the first place Centralia Pets (38–17) in the final standings, followed by the Raymond Venetians (25–29) and South Bend River Rats (11–44). Chehalis pitcher Ray Callahan, who split the season with Centralia and Chehalis, led the Washington State League with both 13 wins and 131 strikeouts.

In 1912, the Chehalis Farmers played the franchise's final minor league season and won the Washington State League championship when the league folded. On July 10, 1912, the Aberdeen Black Cats folded from the league. With three teams remaining, this caused the Washington State League to fold on July 14, 1912. When the season ended, the Chehalis Farmers were in first place with a 25–16 record. Playing under manager James Burns, the Farmers ended the season 3.5 games ahead of the second place Centralia Railroaders (19–17) in the final standings. They were followed by the Aberdeen Black Cats (16–21) and Hoquiam Cougars (17–23). L.G. Taylor of Chehalis won the Washington State League batting title, hitting .351 in the shortened season.

The Washington State League did not return to play in the 1914 season and never reformed. Chehalis, Washington has not hosted another minor league team.

== The ballpark ==
From 1910 to 1912, the Chehalis Washington State League teams hosted minor league home games at Millett Field (also Millet Field) (Note: Early reporting about the field would often spell the name with one "T", however the documented correct spelling of the surname is "Millett".). The park was founded in 1898, and named after Daniel Millett, then owner of the property via a business share of the Chehalis Land and Timber Company. Millett was also the city attorney and served as mayor.

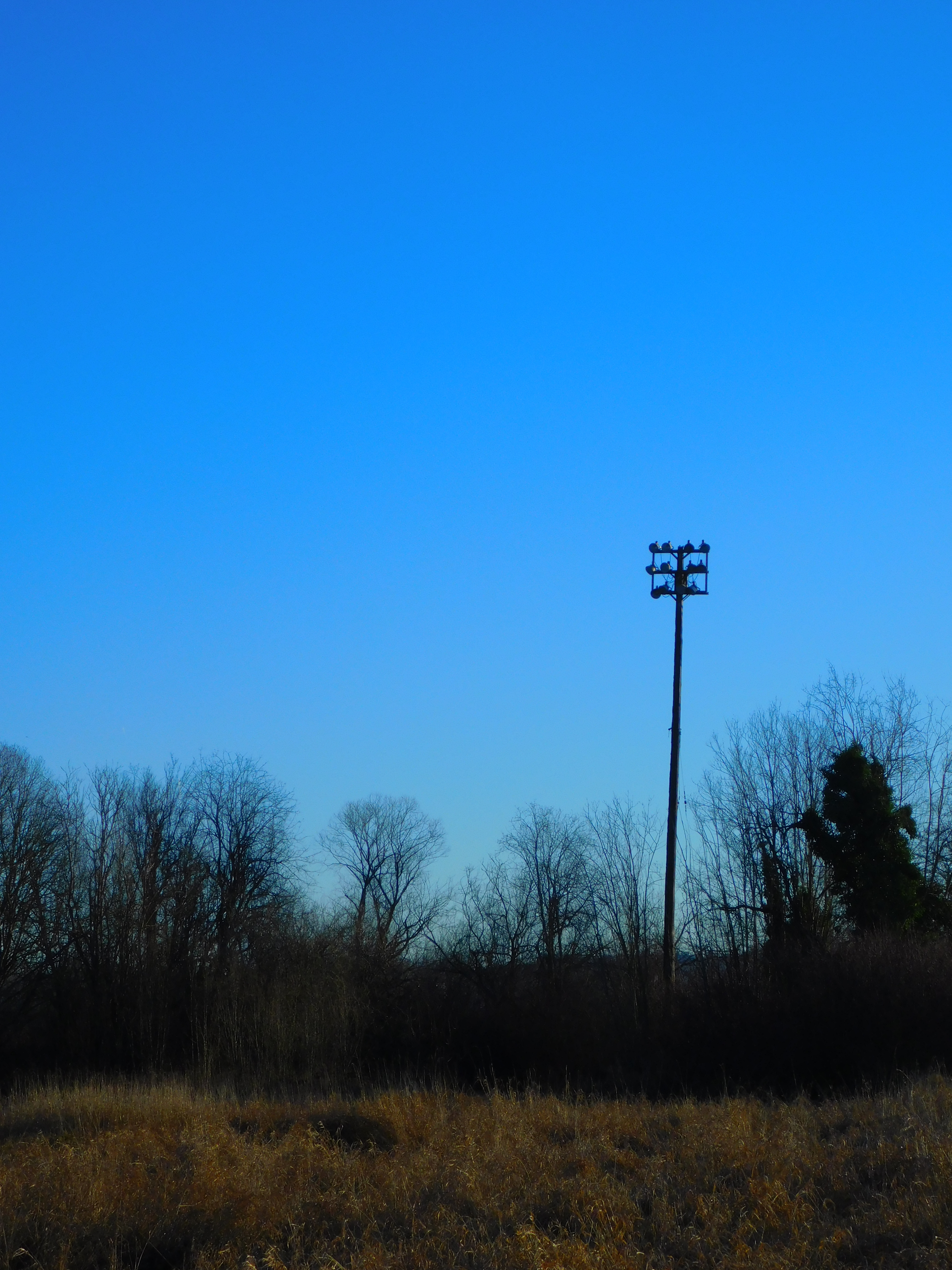
(2022) Millett Field, Chehalis, Washington. The sole remaining light tower at the closed ballpark, situated roughly near the original home plate location.

On April 13, 1914, Millett Field hosted an exhibition game between the Chicago American Giants of the Negro Leagues and the Portland Colts of the Northwestern League. Chicago's player/manager was Baseball Hall of Fame member Rube Foster. The game was arranged by the Citizens' Club of Chehalis and the Centralia Commercial Club.

Following the demise of the Chehalis minor league franchise, the ballpark hosted the Negro leagues Colored Giants of Tacoma, who played games at Millett Field throughout the 1920s against the local Chehalis Moose team and other semi-professional teams.

The ballpark grandstands were removed in 1979. Millett Field has remained a public park. The park is located on Chehalis Avenue in Chehalis, Washington.

== Timeline ==
Year(s)	# Yrs.	Team	Level	League	Ballpark
1910	1	Chehalis Gophers	Class D	Washington State League	Millett Field
1911	1	Chehalis Proteges	Class D	Washington State League	Millett Field
1912	1	Chehalis Farmers	Class D	Washington State League	Millett Field

== Year–by–year records ==
Year	Record	Finish	Manager	Playoffs/Notes
1910	35–19	2nd	Fred Neghring / Thomas Kelly	No playoffs held
1911	36–20	2nd	Dusty Miller / Lenny Taylor	No playoffs held
1912	25–16	1st	James Burns	League folded July 14; League champions

== Notable alumni ==
- Ray Callahan (1910–1911)
- Fielder Jones (1910)
- Con Starkel (1910)
- Chehalis Gophers players
- Chehalis Proteges players
