= Raymond Cougars =

- 1910–1911; Raymond, Washington

Minor league affiliations
- Class: Class D (1910–1911)
- League: Washington State League (1910–1911)

Major league affiliations
- Team: None

Minor league titles
- League titles (1): 1910

Team data
- Name: Raymond Cougars (1910); Raymond Venetians(1911)
- Ballpark: Lions Club Park (1910–1911)

The Raymond Cougars were a minor league baseball team based in Raymond, Washington. In 1910 and 1911, the Raymond Cougars and Raymond "Venetians" teams played exclusively as members of the Class D level Washington State League, with the Cougars winning the 1910 league championship. Raymond hosted minor league home games at the Lions Club Park.

== History ==
Minor league baseball began in Raymond, Washington in 1910, when the Raymond "Cougars" became charter members of the six–team Class D level Washington State League. The Aberdeen Black Cats, Chehalis Gophers, Hoquiam Loggers, Montesano Farmers and Tacoma Cubs eams joined Raymond as charter members in league play.

The Washington State League was organized in Hoquiam, Washington at a meeting held on March 6, 1910. The league was formed as a six–team league, playing a 21-week schedule. The franchises voted to split the shares of tickets equally between the home and away teams. Ten percent of the ticket earnings were to be given to the league for travel expenses. At the initial meeting, Walter A. MacFarlane was elected league president and W. E. Campbell was elected vice president. During the 1910 season, the salary cap was set, with a limit of $850.00 per month.

With the team being managed by Fred Dunbar in 1910, local newspapers called the team "Dunbar's Cougars." Cougars and mountain lions are indigenous to the mountainous region.

Beginning play on May 10, 1910, the Raymond Cougars won the Washington State League championship in their first season of play. The Cougars ended the season with a record of 37–19, playing under Fred Dunbar. The Cougars finished just 1.0 game ahead of the second place Chehalis Gophers (35–19) in the final standings. They were followed by the Aberdeen Black Cats (24–29), Montesano Farmers (22–31), Hoquiam Loggers (12–18) and Tacoma Cubs (8–21). Pitcher James Jachs of Raymond led the Washington State League with both 15 wins and 164 strikeouts.

In 1911, the Raymond Venetians continued play as the Washington State League reduced franchises and became a four–team league. The Centralia Pets, Chehalis Proteges and South Bend River Rats joined Raymond in 1911 league play.

In their final season, the 1911 Raymond Venetians placed third in the Washington State League. The Venetians ended the season with a record of 25–29, playing the season under manager C.D. Wineholt. Raymond finished 12.5 games behind the first place Centralia Pets (38–17) in the final standings, followed by the second place Chehalis Proteges (36–20), with Raymond finishing ahead of the fourth place South Bend River Rats (11–44). Player/manager C.D. Wineholt led the league with 8 home runs and 49 runs scored.

The Raymond franchise permanently folded following the 1911 season. Raymond, Washington has not hosted another minor league team.

== The ballpark ==
The Raymond teams hosted minor league home games at the Lions Club Park. Reportedly, the ballpark had another name in the era. Lions Club Park is still in use today as a public park in Raymond.

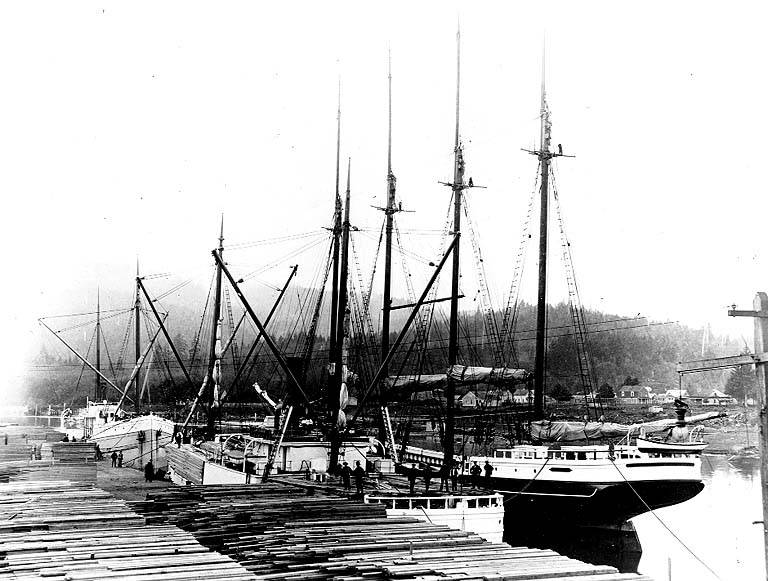
(1905) Waterfront on the Willapa River. Raymond, Washington

== Timeline ==
Year(s)	# Yrs.	Team	Level	League	Ballpark
1910	1	Raymond Cougars	Class D	Washington State League	Lions Club Park
1911	1	Raymond Venetians	Class D	Washington State League	Lions Club Park

== Year–by–year records ==
Year	Record	Finis	Manager	Playoffs/Notes
1910	37–19	1st	Fred Dunbar	No playoffs held
1911	25–29	3rd	C.D. Wineholt	No playoffs held

== Notable alumni ==
No alumni of the Raymond minor league teams advanced to the major leagues.
