= Southwest Washington League =

Minor League Baseball circuit

- Classification: Class-D
- Sport: Minor league baseball
- First season: 1903
- Folded: 1906
- No. of teams: 5
- Country: United States

The Southwest Washington League was a Class-D level Minor League Baseball circuit based in the southwest region of Washington state that played three seasons from 1903 to 1906. The league teams played six times a week, but only the weekend games counted in the standings.

== History ==
Teams in the league included the Aberdeen Pippins, Centralia Midgets, Hoquiam Loggers, Montesano Farmers and Olympia Senators. The first league president was John P. Fink of Olympia, Washington. He was succeed in 1904 by Colonel Fox of Aberdeen, Washington. The inaugural league championship was won by the Aberdeen Pippins, who finished the season with a .611 winning percentage. The Hoquiam Loggers won the league pennant in 1904 with a 13–4 win–loss record. During league meetings before the 1905 season, William E. Campbell of Hoquiam, Washington was elected league president.

== Cities represented ==
- Aberdeen, WA: Aberdeen Pippins 1903–1905
- Centralia, WA: Centralia Midgets 1903–1904
- Hoquiam, WA: Hoquiam Perfect Gentlemen 1903–1904; Hoquiam Loggers 1905
- Montesano, WA: Montesano Farmers 1905
- Olympia, WA: Olympia Senators 1903–1906

== Standings & statistics ==
1903 Southwest Washington League

Team standings	W	L	PCT	GB	Managers
Aberdeen Pippins	11	7	.611	–	Will Campbell
Hoquiam Perfect Gentlemen	11	7	.611	–	Chub Philbrick
Centralia Midgets	7	11	.389	4.0	Paul Ruff / George Dysart
Olympia Senators	7	11	.389	4.0	Jessie Mill

The league played six times a week, but only the weekend games counted.
Hoquiam refused to play off the tie; the championship was awarded to Aberdeen.

Player statistics
Player	Team	Stat	Tot	Player	Team	Stat	Tot
Ira Harmon	Centralia	BA	.341	Indian Morris	Hoquiam	W	12
Culton	Centralia	Runs	16	Indian Morris	Hoquiam	SO	106
Culton	Centralia	Hits	25	Indian Morris	Hoquiam	Pct	.706; 12–5
Ira Harmon	Centralia	HR	2				

1904 Southwest Washington League

Team standings	W	L	PCT	GB	Managers
Hoquiam Perfect Gentlemen	14	4	.778	-	Chub Philbrick
Aberdeen Pippins	10	8	.556	4.0	Robert Brown
Centralia Midgets	6	12	.333	8.0	Bloomfield
Olympia Senators	6	12	.333	8.0	Jessie Mill

The league played six times a week, but only the weekend games counted.
No individual Statistics Available.

1905 Southwest Washington League

Team standings	W	L	PCT	GB	Managers
Montesano Farmers	24	10	.706	–	Will Campbell
Olympia Senators	20	16	.556	5.0	James Mitchell
Aberdeen Pippins	17	17	.500	7.0	Robert Brown
Hoquiam Loggers	9	27	.250	16.0	Graham

The league played six times a week, but only the weekend games counted.
No individual Statistics Available.

== See also ==
- Northwest League
- Washington State League
- Western Tri-State League
