= Woody Jensen =

American baseball player (1907–2001)

- Outfielder
- Born: August 11, 1907; Bremerton, Washington, U.S.
- Died: October 5, 2001 (aged 94); Wichita, Kansas, U.S.
- Batted: Left Threw: Left

MLB debut
- April 20, 1931, for the Pittsburgh Pirates

Last MLB appearance
- June 4, 1939, for the Pittsburgh Pirates

MLB statistics
- Batting average: .285
- Home runs: 26
- Runs batted in: 235
- Stats at Baseball Reference

Teams
- Pittsburgh Pirates (1931–1939)

Forrest Docenus "Woody" Jensen (August 11, 1907 – October 5, 2001) was an American professional baseball player who played from 1931 to 1939 as an outfielder. He set a Major League Baseball season record of 696 at bats in 1936 that was not broken until Matty Alou surpassed the mark in 1969. Jensen played his entire career with the Pittsburgh Pirates.

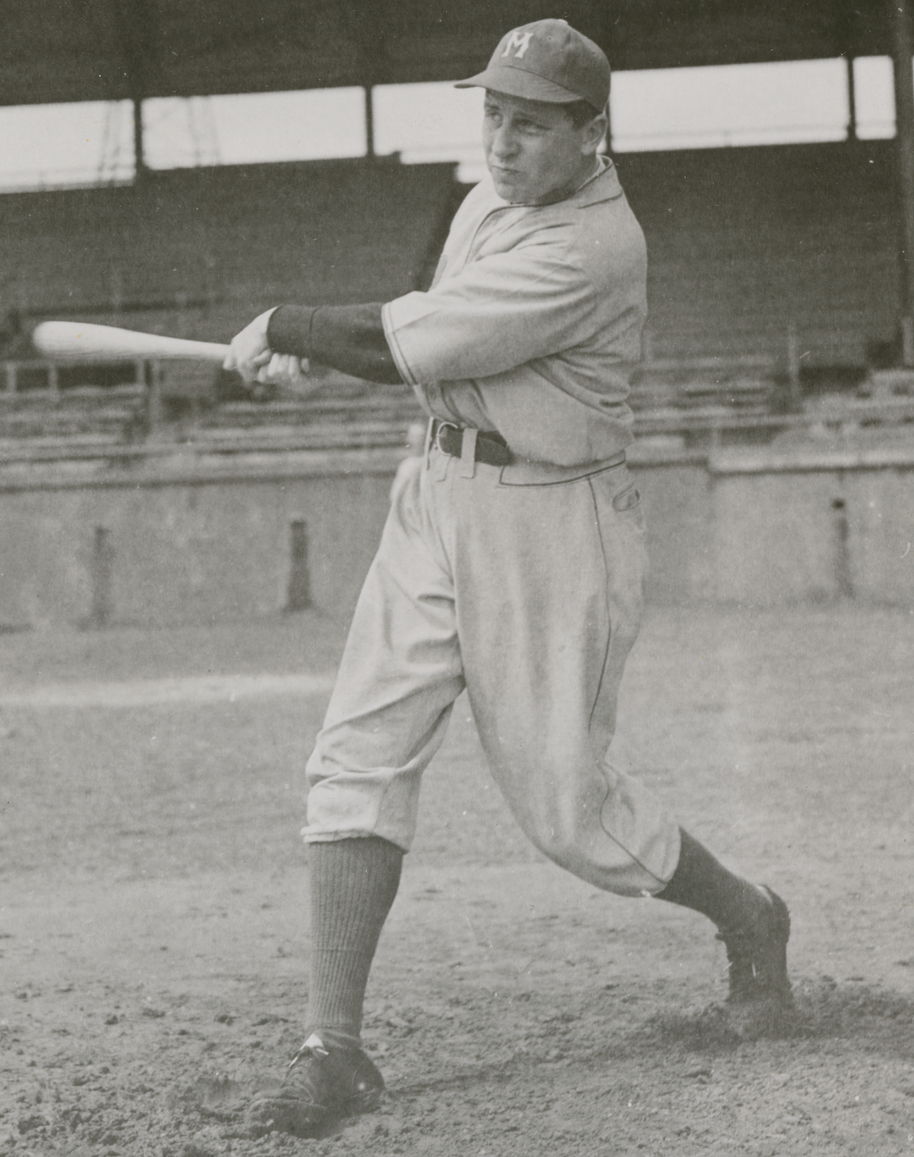
Woody Jensen, c. 1941

== Early life ==
Jensen was born in Bremerton, Washington on August 11, 1909. His nickname, Woody, was born as a sequitur to his first name. He first gained notice while a teenager as a Timber League ballplayer at Millett Field in Chehalis, Washington. He was signed in 1927 to a minor league contract by the Los Angeles Angels of the Pacific Coast League. The Pirates purchased his contract in 1930.

== Playing career ==
Jensen was a part time player for the Pirates beginning in 1933, batting .296. He followed up the next season with a .290 average. In 1935, Jensen replaced Babe Herman and played 143 games, collecting 203 hits, and recorded a .324 batting average for the season. His average bested those of his fellow teammates, the Paul Waner and Lloyd Waner brothers.

== Career statistics ==
In 738 games over nine seasons, Jensen posted a .285 batting average (774-for-2720) with 392 runs, 114 doubles, 37 triples, 26 home runs, 235 RBI, 69 bases on balls, .307 on-base percentage and .382 slugging percentage.
