= Southwest Washington =

- Region
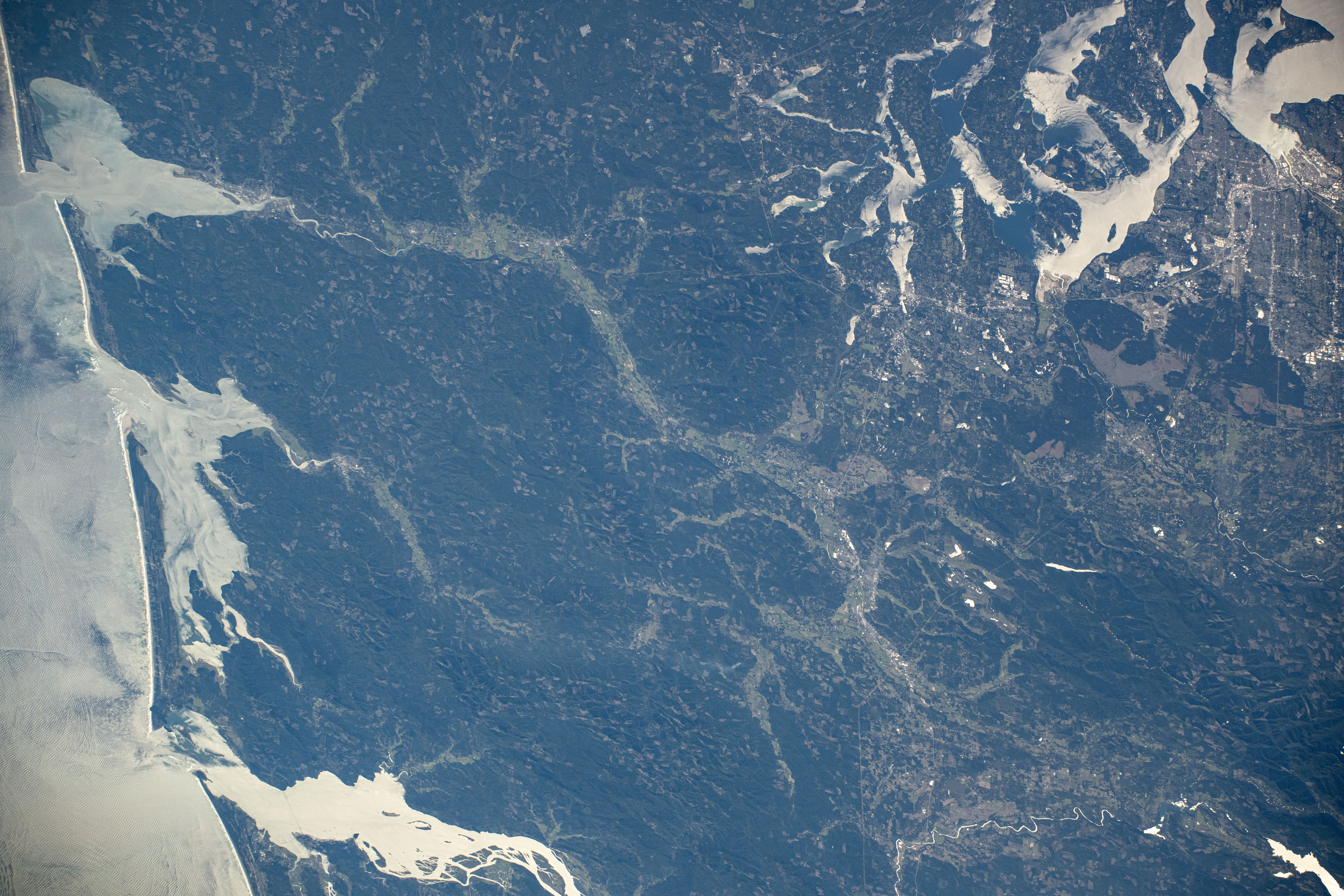
- View from Expedition 72, October 2024

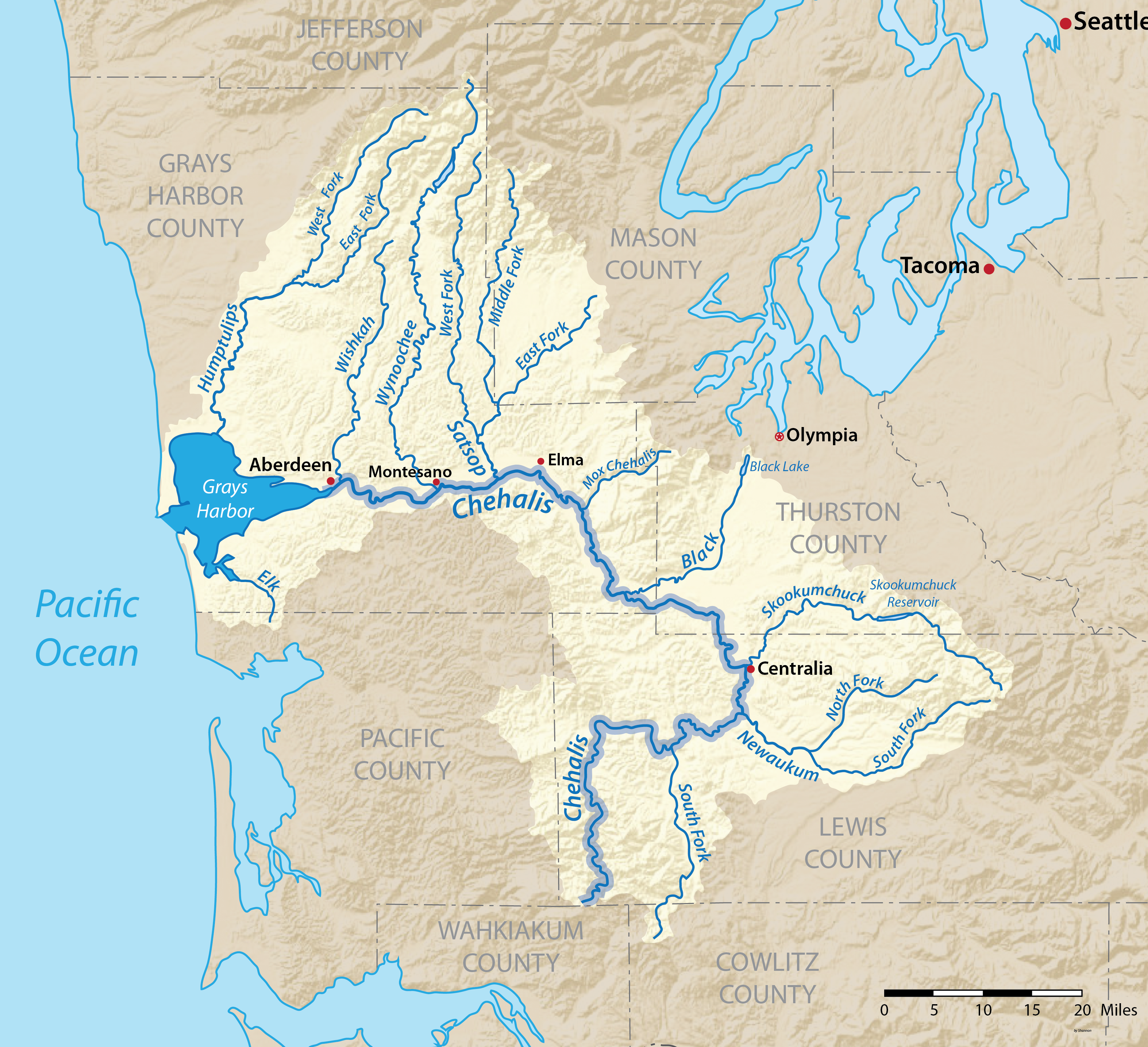
- Southwest Washington with Chehalis River watershed highlighted
- Coordinates: 46°30′N 122°45′W
- Country: United States
- State: Washington

Southwest Washington is a geographical area of the U.S. state of Washington, encompassing six counties in Western Washington. (Note: Pacific, Lewis, Wahkiakum, Cowlitz, Clark and Skamania Counties according to State of Washington Tourism Washington State Department of Ecology includes the Olympic Peninsula and Pierce County in addition to those mentioned before (Clallam, Clark, Cowlitz, Grays Harbor, Jefferson, Mason, Lewis, Pierce, Skamania, Thurston, and Wahkiakum counties).) It generally includes the area south of Olympia and Thurston County, down to the Oregon-Washington state line at Vancouver, and west of the Yakima Indian Reservation.

== Cities ==
Cities and towns in Southwest Washington include:

- Camas in Clark County
- Centralia in Lewis County
- Chehalis in Lewis County
- Kelso in Cowlitz County
- Longview in Cowlitz County
- South Bend in Pacific County
- Vancouver in Clark County
- Washougal in Clark County
- Woodland in Cowlitz County
- Ridgefield in Clark County

== Culture ==
The Southwest Washington Fair is held annually in the city of Chehalis.

In the early 20th century, the region was home to a Class-D Minor league baseball league known as the Southwest Washington League.

The Sou'wester is the magazine of the Pacific County Historical Society.

== Education ==
The Southwest Washington State College Committee study of the late 1960s eventually resulted in the establishment of The Evergreen State College in Olympia.

Washington State University Vancouver is located in Vancouver and serves as the only four-year research university in Southwest Washington.

== Healthcare ==
PeaceHealth Southwest Medical Center in Vancouver is the region's largest medical center.

== Transportation ==
The major north–south highways in Southwest Washington are U.S. Route 101, which runs along the Pacific Coast, and Interstate 5, a freeway between Seattle and Portland, Oregon. Several east–west highways connect these two routes, including State Route 4 along the Columbia River; State Route 6 between Raymond and Chehalis; and U.S. Route 12, which also traverses the Cascade Range at White Pass.

== See also ==
- Area code 360 – serves Southwest Washington and other areas of Western Washington outside of the Seattle metropolitan area
- List of regions of the United States

== Bibliography ==
- Federal Writers' Project (2014) [1941], The WPA Guide to Washington: The Evergreen State, American Guide Series, San Antonio: Trinity University Press, ISBN 978-1-59534-245-4
