= Aberdeen Pippins =

- 1903–1906; Aberdeen, Washington

Minor league affiliations
- Class: Class D (1903–1906)
- League: Southwest Washington League (1903–1906)

Major league affiliations
- Team: None

Minor league titles
- League titles (1): 1903

Team data
- Name: Aberdeen Pippins (1903–1906)
- Ballpark: Electric Park (1903–1906)

The Aberdeen Pippins were a minor league baseball team based in Aberdeen, Washington. From 1903 to 1906, the Pippins played exclusively as members of the Class D level Southwest Washington League for the duration or the league, winning the 1903 championship. The Pippins hosted home minor league games at Electric Park.

== History ==
Minor league baseball began in Aberdeen, Washington in 1903. The Aberdeen "Pippins" became charter members of the four–team Class D level Southwest Washington League. The Centralia Midgets, Hoquiam Perfect Gentlemen and Olympia Senators joined Aberdeen as charter members in beginning league play on May 10, 1903.

1903 was the first season of the National Association governing body of minor league baseball. The Southwest Washington League was designated as a Class D league by the National Association. There was a $250 league entry fee for Aberdeen and the other league teams to begin play.

The Aberdeen "Pippins" nickname corresponds with local agriculture in the region in the era. By definition, a "pippin" refers to varieties of apples.

On May 22, 1903, President Theodore Roosevelt was present for an Aberdeen home game against Olympia for a "President Day" afternoon game. The Pippins lost to Olympia in the contest.

In their first season of play, the Aberdeen Pippins won a Southwest Washington League championship amidst controversy. In the league structure, Southwest Washington League teams played games six times per week, but only weekend games were counted for the league standings. At season's end, both Aberdeen and Hoquiam tied for 1st place with identical 11–7 records. Aberdeen was then awarded the championship when Hoquiam refused to participate in a playoff game. Billy Campbell managed Aberdeen.

In 1904, the Pippins played a series against the Hoquiam Perfect Gentlemen for a $50 purse.

Continuing Southwest Washington League play in 1904, the Aberdeen Pippins finished in second place in the four–team league. The league continued the practice of only counting weekend games in the standings, while playing six times per week overall. Ending the season with a record of 10–8, Aberdeen played under managers Bill Campbell and Bob Brown. The Pippins finished 4.0 games behind the 1st place Hoquiam Perfect Gentlemen (14–4) in the final standings.

The 1905 Olympia Senators placed third in the Southwest Washington League standings. The Southwest Washington League continued as a four–team league, as the Centralia Midgets were replaced by the Montesano Farmers in 1905 league play. The Southwest Washington League continued with counting only weekend games for the league standings. Aberdeen had a final record of 17–17, playing under manager Bob Brown. Montesano won the league championship, with Olympia 5.0 games behind, followed by Aberdeen 7.0 games behind.

The Southwest Washington League played a 1906 season as a Class D level league with Olympia and the Aberdeen Pippins and Hoquiam Loggers as the three league members referenced. Team and individual records, statistics and rosters for the 1906 season are unknown.

Aberdeen next hosted a minor league team when the 1906 Grays Harbor Lumberman became members of the Class B level Northwestern League.

== The ballpark ==
The Aberdeen Pippins hosted home minor league home games at Electric Park. The ballpark was located at Myrtle Street & Oak Street in Aberdeen.

On May 22, 1903, the ballpark hosted President Theodore Roosevelt, who was in attendance for the Aberdeen home game against Olympia. The ballpark visit was termed as "President Day" for the afternoon game. The host Pippins lost to Olympia in the contest.

== Timeline ==
Year(s)	# Yrs.	Team	Level	League	Ballpark
1903–1906	4	Aberdeen Pippins	Class D	Southwest Washington League	Electric Park

== Year-by-year records ==
Year	Record	Finish	Manager	Playoffs/Notes
1903	11–7	1st (tie)	Billy Campbell	Hoquiam refused playoff game League champions
1904	10–8	2nd	Billy Campbell / Bob Brown	No playoffs held
1905	17–17	3rd	Bob Brown	No playoffs held

== Notable alumni ==
- Ed Bruyette (1903)
- Aberdeen Pippins players
