= Fielder Jones =

American baseball player and manager (1871–1934)

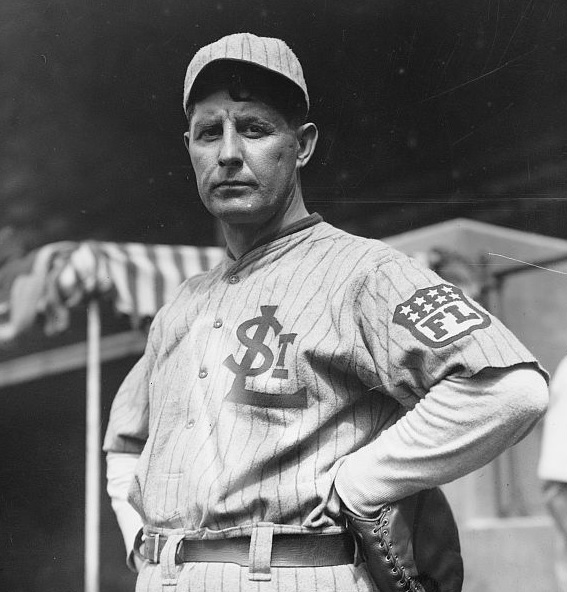
- Jones in 1914
- Center fielder / Manager
- Born: August 13, 1871; Shinglehouse, Pennsylvania, U.S.
- Died: March 13, 1934 (aged 62); Portland, Oregon, U.S.
- Batted: Left Threw: Right

MLB debut
- April 18, 1896, for the Brooklyn Bridegrooms

Last MLB appearance
- September 1, 1915, for the St. Louis Terriers

MLB statistics
- Batting average: .285
- Home runs: 21
- Runs batted in: 631
- Managerial record: 683–582
- Winning %: .540
- Stats at Baseball Reference

Teams
- As player: Brooklyn Bridegrooms / Superbas (1896–1900); Chicago White Sox (1901–1908); St. Louis Terriers (1914–1915); As manager: Chicago White Sox (1904–1908); St. Louis Terriers (1914–1915); St. Louis Browns (1916–1918)

Career highlights and awards
- World Series champion (1906)

Fielder Allison Jones (August 13, 1871 – March 13, 1934) was an American center fielder and manager in Major League Baseball (MLB). He was best known as the player-manager of the World Series champion 1906 Chicago White Sox, a team who succeeded in spite of such poor offense that they were known as the "Hitless Wonders".

== Early life ==
Born in Shinglehouse, Pennsylvania to a father who owned a general store, He was named after his uncle, Union General Fielder A Jones. Jones learned to play baseball at his preparatory school at Alfred University. As a young man, Jones worked as a surveyor with his brother and ventured to the Pacific Northwest by 1891.

== Playing career ==
Jones entered professional baseball playing as an outfielder and catcher for Portland in the Oregon State League in 1891 or 1893, depending on the source. He played minor league ball in Binghamton, New York, and Springfield, Massachusetts, where he was an accomplished hitter.

Jones's major league playing career began with the Brooklyn Bridegrooms in 1896. In 1901, he joined the Chicago White Sox in the new American League. He was named player-manager in 1904 to replace Jimmy Callahan. Owner Charles Comiskey named Jones manager, desiring a strong-willed leader. The White Sox finished two games short of a pennant in 1905. Bolstered by a nineteen game winning streak, Jones managed the "Hitless Wonders" in the 1906 World Series, which was the White Sox' first World Series win. Playing in that World Series, he hit only .143 (3-for-21) but scored four runs and stole three bases. That year, the White Sox had a team batting average of only .230 while being third in runs. The aging roster sputtered late in 1907 and then lost the pennant on the final day in 1908 to the same team in the Detroit Tigers. Jones quit the team after the season, citing burnout from having to deal with Comiskey.

In 1910, Jones came out of retirement to play for the Chehalis Gophers after the team's player/manager was reportedly stabbed by another member of the team. Playing for no salary, and with permission from Comiskey, Jones batted .358 to win the Washington State League batting title. Six years after his last game with the White Sox, he joined the St. Louis Terriers of the newly formed Federal League, where he served as a player-manager before the league folded. He had one last stint as a manager with the St. Louis Browns, but his earlier success with the White Sox eluded him, as his St. Louis teams never finished above fifth place.

== Post career ==
Jones moved to Portland, Oregon, investing in timber and became head coach for the Oregon State Beavers baseball team in 1910, going 13–4–1 and winning the Northwest championship.

== Career statistics ==
In 1,788 major-league games over 15 seasons, Jones posted a .285 batting average (1,920-for-6,747) with 1,180 runs, 206 doubles, 75 triples, 21 home runs, 631 runs batted in, 359 stolen bases, 817 bases on balls, .368 on-base percentage and .347 slugging percentage. He finished his career with a .962 fielding percentage.

== Later life ==
Jones died of heart disease in Portland, Oregon, at age 62.

== Managerial record ==
Team	Year	Regular season					Postseason			
Team	Year	Games	Won	Lost	Win %	Finish	Won	Lost	Win %	Result
CWS	1904	113	66	47	.584	3rd in AL	–	–	–	–
CWS	1905	152	92	60	.605	2nd in AL	–	–	–	–
CWS	1906	151	93	58	.616	1st in AL	4	2	.667	Won World Series (CHC)
CWS	1907	151	87	64	.576	3rd in AL	–	–	–	–
CWS	1908	152	88	64	.579	3rd in AL	–	–	–	–
CWS total		719	426	293	.592		4	2	.667	
SLT	1914	38	12	26	.316	8th in FL	–	–	–	–
SLT	1915	154	87	67	.565	2nd in FL	–	–	–	–
SLT total		192	99	93	.516		0	0	–	
SLB	1916	154	79	75	.513	5th in AL	–	–	–	–
SLB	1917	154	57	97	.370	7th in AL	–	–	–	–
SLB	1918	46	22	24	.478	fired	–	–	–	–
SLB total		354	158	196	.446		0	0	–	
Total		1264	683	582	.540		4	2	.667	

== See also ==
- List of Major League Baseball career runs scored leaders
- List of Major League Baseball career stolen bases leaders
- List of Major League Baseball player-managers
