= Fielder Alsor Jones =

American Civil War Union officer, lawyer, and politician (1834–1882)

- Born: February 27, 1834; Potter County, Pennsylvania, U.S.
- Died: January 7, 1882 (aged 47) near Toledo, Ohio, U.S.
- Burial place: Sharon Center Cemetery, Sharon Center, Potter County, Pennsylvania, U.S.
- Military career
- Allegiance: United States; Union
- Branch: United States Army; Union Army
- Service years: 1861–1865
- Rank: Lieutenant Colonel; Colonel; Brevet Brigadier General
- Unit: 6th Indiana Infantry Regiment
- Commands: 39th Indiana Infantry Regiment; 8th Indiana Cavalry Regiment
- Conflicts: American Civil War: Battle of Corrick's Ford; Battle of Shiloh; Battle of Perryville; Battle of Stones River; Battle of Chickamauga; Chattanooga campaign; Atlanta campaign; Sherman's March to the Sea; Carolinas campaign
- Other work: Lawyer, newspaper editor, Mayor of Macon, Missouri

Fielder Alsor Jones (February 27, 1834 – January 7, 1882) was an American soldier, lawyer, newspaper editor, and politician. He served as a Union Army officer during the American Civil War, holding substantive commissions as lieutenant colonel of the 39th Indiana Infantry Regiment and colonel of the 8th Indiana Cavalry Regiment in the Army of the Cumberland, and receiving a brevet commission as brigadier general of United States Volunteers for gallant services. After the war he settled in Macon, Missouri, where he practiced law, edited the Macon Republican, and served as the city's mayor.

== Early life and education ==
Jones was born February 27, 1834, in Potter County, Pennsylvania, to a family of modest means. His father was killed by a falling tree when Jones was five years old, and his stepfather died when he was twelve, leaving him the eldest of five children in a poor household. At the age of thirteen he helped support the family by hauling pine logs with an ox team for five dollars per month, studying in his spare time. His mother was Phoebe C. (Nichols) Drake (1809–1885), and among his siblings was Lieutenant Benjamin F. Jones (1835–1873), also a Union officer, with whom he shares a monument at Sharon Center Cemetery.

At fifteen Jones entered Richburg Academy, where he developed a particular interest in music, which he later taught. He subsequently taught at Waterford Academy in Pennsylvania, earning enough to educate himself and a sister. He entered Allegheny College as a sophomore and graduated in 1859 with honors, winning a prize for English composition and literature. After graduating he taught for a year at Meadville Academy and read law under Hiram Richmond, gaining admission to the bar. He married Kate Saeger of Saegertown, Pennsylvania.

Jones then moved to Seymour, Jackson County, Indiana, where he taught school and began practicing law, taking an active part in the 1860 political campaign. At a public meeting held in Seymour after the fall of Fort Sumter in April 1861, Jones moved for the appointment of a committee to draft resolutions and served on it himself, the committee reporting resolutions pledging the county's loyal citizens, "without distinction of party," to the support of the Union.

== Civil War ==
Within a week of the outbreak of the war, Jones organized a volunteer company at Seymour. On the evening of April 22, 1861, the men assembled before a large crowd to patriotic speeches before departing by train for Indianapolis; the company was designated Company H of the 6th Indiana Infantry Regiment, enrolled for three months' service and mustered in on April 24, 1861, with Jones as captain. The 6th Indiana, described as the first regiment raised in Indiana for the war, was ordered to western Virginia under Brigadier General Thomas A. Morris; it took part in the action at Philippi on June 3 and fought at Corrick's (Carrick's) Ford on July 12 before being mustered out in August 1861. In the western Virginia fighting Jones's company captured a large wagon train, and Jones was severely wounded—shot through the right arm and left leg and through the liver and lower lobe of the right lung. Initially thought to be mortally wounded, he recovered, and while convalescing at Indianapolis became acquainted with Governor Oliver P. Morton, who afterward remained a supporter.

After his three-month term expired, Jones helped raise a second company at Seymour—Company K of the regiment that became the 39th Indiana—composed largely of men from his original three-months company; it was mustered in on August 19, 1861. Jones was appointed lieutenant colonel of the 39th Indiana Infantry Regiment, a substantive rank he held until August 8, 1864. Serving in the Army of the Cumberland, he saw action at Pittsburg Landing (Shiloh), Perryville, Stones River, Chickamauga, Chattanooga, and in the engagements around Atlanta.

At the Battle of Stones River the 39th Indiana was posted on the extreme right of the army's right wing, the sector overrun by the Confederate assault on the morning of December 31, 1862. Commanding the regiment, Jones had five companies detailed on the picket line; in his official report he described rallying his companies behind a rail fence under heavy fire as the right wing collapsed, twice checking the advancing Confederate line and covering the withdrawal of a Union artillery piece before being forced back toward the Nashville Pike. He reported the regiment's losses as 31 killed, 118 wounded, and 281 missing, many of the missing believed to have been wounded and captured. On January 1, 1863, the 49th Ohio and 89th Indiana were consolidated and, at Colonel William H. Gibson's request, Jones assumed command of the combined force, which made a bayonet charge at the head of the brigade on January 2. After the battle he was placed in command of a brigade and was commended for efficiency and bravery. During the Tullahoma campaign in June 1863, Jones led five companies of the 39th Indiana Mounted Infantry at the head of Colonel Luther Prentiss Bradley's brigade, skirmishing with Confederate cavalry pickets south of Murfreesboro.

In 1863 the regiment was mounted and redesignated the 8th Indiana Cavalry Regiment, with Jones as its colonel—also a substantive rank. He took part in General Rousseau's raid into Alabama and commanded a brigade of cavalry under Brigadier General Edward M. McCook during McCook's raid around Atlanta; when McCook's command was surrounded at Brown's Mill, Jones cut his way through the enemy and brought out the only organized body of troops from the expedition. He was subsequently placed in command of a cavalry division of fourteen regiments in the Atlanta campaign under Brigadier General Judson Kilpatrick, and after the Battle of Jonesborough was brevetted brigadier general for gallant services. He served through Sherman's March to the Sea and the Carolinas campaign. Over the course of the war he was wounded five times and had four horses killed under him.

His brevet as brigadier general of United States Volunteers carried the date of rank of March 13, 1865, the "omnibus" date to which the great majority of Union brevet awards were antedated as the war drew to a close; such brevets were honorary grades made in recognition of service rather than promotions, and did not carry the command authority, pay, or seniority of a substantive brigadier general.

== Later life ==
In September 1865, after mustering out, Jones moved to Missouri and settled at Macon. A continual sufferer from his wartime wounds, he nonetheless resumed the practice of law and became a leading attorney before the state and federal courts. His first wife died of consumption in July 1866 after a lingering illness; in 1870 he married Sallie Clayton.

Jones was active in Republican politics, serving on the party's state executive committee, as a presidential elector in 1872, and as the Republican nominee for the state senate in 1874, in which he was defeated. In 1878 he was elected mayor of Macon. From 1871 he served as editor-in-chief of the Macon Republican. He was a member of the Methodist Episcopal Church.

Jones died on January 7, 1882, aboard a train near Toledo, Ohio, while traveling with his wife to visit his childhood home in Pennsylvania. He was buried at Sharon Center Cemetery, Sharon Center, Potter County, Pennsylvania.

== Legacy ==
The Major League Baseball player and manager Fielder Jones (1871–1934), best known as player-manager of the 1906 World Series champion Chicago White Sox, was named after his great-uncle, Fielder Alsor Jones.

== See also ==
- List of American Civil War brevet generals (Union)
- Indiana in the American Civil War
