= Bill Hanlon =

American baseball player (1876–1905)

- First baseman
- Born: June 24, 1876; Los Angeles, California
- Died: November 23, 1905 (aged 29); Los Angeles, California
- Batted: Right Threw: Unknown

MLB debut
- April 16, 1903, for the Chicago Cubs

Last MLB appearance
- April 32, 1903, for the Chicago Cubs

MLB statistics
- Batting average: .095
- Home runs: 0
- Runs batted in: 2
- Stats at Baseball Reference

Teams
- Chicago Cubs (1903)

William Joseph Hanlon (June 24, 1876 in Los Angeles, California – November 23, 1905 in Los Angeles, California), was an American professional baseball player who was in the Major Leagues in 1903.
