= Montesano Farmers =

- 1905–1910; (1905, 1910); Montesano, Washington

Minor league affiliations
- Class: Class D (1905, 1910)
- League: Southwest Washington League (1905); Washington State League (1910)

Major league affiliations
- Team: None

Minor league titles
- League titles (1): 1905

Team data
- Name: Montesano Farmers (1905, 1910)
- Ballpark: John W. Vessey Memorial Ball Park (1905, 1910)

The Montesano Farmers were a minor league baseball team based in Montesano, Washington. In 1905 and 1910, the Montesano Farmers played as members of the 1905 Class D level Southwest Washington League and 1910 Washington State League, winning the 1905 Southwest Washington League championship. The Farmers hosted home minor league games at Vessey Memorial Ball Park.

== History ==
Minor league baseball began in Montesano, Washington in 1905, when the Montesano "Farmers" became members of the four–team Class D level Southwest Washington League. Montesano joined the Aberdeen Pippins, Hoquiam Loggers and Olympia Senators teams in beginning league play. The league teams played games six days per week, but only weekend games were counted for the standings.

In their first season of play, the Farmers won the Southwest Washington League championship. The Farmers placed first in the final standings with a 24–10 record, winning the title playing under manager Billy Campbell. The Farmers finished 5.0 games ahead of the second place Olympia Senators, followed by Aberdeen and Hoquiam. Montesano did not return to the league in 1906.

The 1910 Montesano Farmers resumed minor league baseball play, when the Farmers became charter members of the six–team Class D level Washington State League. The Aberdeen Black Cats, Chehalis Gophers, Hoquiam Loggers, Raymond Cougars and Tacoma Cubs teams joined Montesano as charter members in league play.

The Washington State League was organized in Hoquiam, Washington at a league meeting held on March 6, 1910. The league was formed as a six–team league, playing a 21-week schedule. The franchises voted to split the shares of tickets equally between the home and away teams. Ten percent of the ticket earnings were given to the league for travel expenses. At the initial meeting, Walter A. MacFarlane was elected league president and W.E. Campbell was elected vice president. During the 1910 season, the salary cap was set, with a limit of $850.00 per month.

Beginning league play on May 10, 1910, the Montesano Farmers placed fourth in the Washington State League in their final season of play. The Farmers ended the season with a record of 22–31, playing under manager Chub Philbrick. The Farmers finished 13.0 games behind the first place Raymond Cougars. Raymond (36–19) was followed by the 2nd place Chehalis Gophers (35–19), Aberdeen Black Cats (24–29), Montesano Farmers (22–31) Hoquiam Loggers (12–18) and Tacoma Cubs (8–21) in the final standings. The Washington State League continued play in 1911, but was reduced to four teams, with the Montesano franchise folding from the league.

Montesano, Washington has not hosted another minor league team.

== The ballpark ==
The Montesano Farmers hosted home minor league home games at John W. Vessey Memorial Ball Park. Still in use today, is noted the ballpark likely was under a different name in the era. The ballpark is located at 900 Pioneer Avenue East in Montesano.

== Timeline ==
Year(s)	# Yrs.	Team	Level	League	Ballpark
1905	1	Montesano Farmers	Class D	Southwest Washington League	Vessey Memorial Ballpark
1910	1	Montesano Farmers	Class D	Washington State League	Vessey Memorial Ballpark

== Year–by–year records ==
Year	Record	Finish	Manager	Playoffs/Notes
1905	24–10	1st	Billy Campbell	League champions
1910	22–31	4th	Chub Philbrick	No playoffs held

=== Notable alumni ===
- Charley Moore (1910)

=== See also ===
Montesano Farmers players
