= Washington State League =

- Classification: Class D (1910—1912)
- Sport: Minor League Baseball
- First season: 1897
- Folded: July 14, 1912
- Director: W. E. Campbell (1910)
- President: Walter R. McFarlane (1910); O.J. Albers (1911—1912)
- No. of teams: 8
- Country: United States of America
- Most titles: 1 Raymond Cougars (1910); Centralia Pets (1911); Chehalis Farmers (1912)
- Related competitions: Pacific Coast International League

The Washington State League was a Class-D minor league baseball circuit in Washington state that existed for three seasons—from 1910 to 1912. Teams in the league included the Aberdeen Black Cats, Chehalis Gophers, Hoquiam Loggers, Centralia Pets, Montesano Farmers, Raymond Cougars, Tacoma Cubs, South Bend River Rats and Centralia Railroaders. The Washington State League was also the name of an independent baseball league in 1897.

== History ==
The Washington State League played the 1897 season as an independent baseball league, with unknown teams and standings.

In 1910, the league reformed. The 1910 league was organized at a meeting in Hoquiam, Washington on March 6, 1910, as a six–team circuit with a 21–week schedule. It was approved to split the shares of tickets equally between the home and away teams, with ten percent of the ticket earnings given to the league for travel expenses. Walter A. MacFarlane was elected league president and W. E. Campbell was elected vice president. During the 1910 season, the salary cap was limited to $850 per month.

In July 1910, Montesano Farmers second baseman Otto Moore was struck on the head with a baseball pitched by Harold Cross. As a result, Moore fell into a coma.

The Raymond Cougars won the 1910 Washington State League championship with a record of 36 wins and 19 losses (.655 winning percentage).

The league reduced to four teams in 1911 and 1912, folding during its final season. The Centralia Pets and Chehalis Farmers won championships in those seasons. The league permanently folded on July 14, 1912.

== Cities represented ==
- Aberdeen, WA: Aberdeen Black Cats 1910, 1912
- Centralia, WA: Centralia Pets 1911; Centralia Railroaders 1912
- Chehalis, WA: Chehalis Gophers 1910; Chehalis Proteges 1911; Chehalis Farmers 1912
- Hoquiam, WA: Hoquiam Loggers 1910; Hoquiam Cougars 1912
- Montesano, WA: Montesano Farmers 1910
- Raymond, WA: Raymond Cougars 1910; Raymond Venetians 1911
- South Bend, WA: South Bend River Rats 1911
- Tacoma, WA: Tacoma Cubs 1910

== Standings & statistics ==
1910 Washington State League

Team standings	W	L	PCT	GB	Managers
Raymond Cougars	36	19	.655	-	Fred Dunbar
Chehalis Gophers	35	19	.618	0.5	Fred Heghring / Thomas Kelly
Aberdeen Black Cats	24	29	.453	11.0	Dick Boettiger
Montesano Farmers	22	31	.415	13.0	Chub Philbrick
Hoquiam Loggers	12	18	.400	NA	Wells
Tacoma Cubs	8	21	.276	NA	Joe Dryer

Hoquiam disbanded July 15; Tacoma disbanded July 18.

Player statistics
Player	Team	Stat	Tot	Player	Team	Stat	Tot
Fielder Jones	Chehalis	BA	.358	James Jachs	Raymond	W	15
White McBride	Chehalis	Runs	48	James Jachs	Raymond	SO	164
Frank Jansa	Chehalis	Hits	70	Clarence Krause	Chehalis	PCT	.833 5–1

1911 Washington State League

Team standings	W	L	PCT	GB	Managers
Centralia Pets	38	17	.691	-	W.R. Patton / Guy Muck
Chehalis Proteges	36	20	.648	2.5	Dusty Miller / Lenny Taylor
Raymond Venetians	25	29	.463	12.5	C.D. Wineholt
South Bend River Rats	11	44	.200	27.0	NA

Player statistics
Player	Team	Stat	Tot	Player	Team	Stat	Tot
Ted Reed	South Bend	BA	.333	Ray Callahan	Centra/Chehal	W	13
Tate Berry	Chehalis	Runs	49	Raymond Baker	Raymond	W	13
C.D. Wineholt	Raym/Chehal	Runs	49	Ray Callahan	Centra/Chehal	SO	131
Howard Guynn	Centralia	Hits	72	Heinie Berger	Centralia	PCT	.778 7–2
C.D. Wineholt	Raym/Chehal	HR	8				

1912 Washington State League

Team standings	W	L	PCT	GB	Managers
Chehalis Farmers	25	16	.610	-	James Burns
Centralia Railroaders	19	17	.528	3.5	W.R. Patton / George Dysart
Aberdeen Black Cats	16	21	.432	7.0	Thomas Kelly
Hoquiam Cougars	17	23	.425	7.5	Ed Ford / Joe Wilkins

Aberdeen disbanded July 10.
The league disbanded July 14.

Player statistics
Player	Team	Stat	Tot	Player	Team	Stat	Tot
L.G. Taylor	Chehalis	BA	.351	F.B. Archer	Chehalis	W	9
Arthur Haley	Chehalis	Runs	17	Heinie Berger	Hoquiam	SO	82
E. Carrigan	Chehalis	Hits	23	Walter Frink	Chehalis	PCT	.800 8–2
L.A. Giddings	Aberdeen	Hits	23				
Kinkelon	Hoquiam	HR	2				
