= Ray Callahan (baseball) =

American baseball player (1891–1973)

- Pitcher
- Born: August 29, 1891; Ashland, Wisconsin, U.S.
- Died: January 23, 1973 (aged 81); Olympia, Washington, U.S.
- Batted: Left Threw: Left

MLB debut
- September 12, 1915, for the Cincinnati Reds

Last MLB appearance
- September 27, 1915, for the Cincinnati Reds

MLB statistics
- Win–loss record: 0–0
- Earned run average: 8.53
- Strikeouts: 4
- Stats at Baseball Reference

Teams
- Cincinnati Reds (1915)

Ray Callahan (born Raymond James Callahan) was an American Major League Baseball (MLB) pitcher. He played with the Cincinnati Reds in 1915.
