= Hoquiam Loggers =

- 1903–1937; (1903–06, 1910, 1912, 1924–1937); Hoquiam, Washington

Minor league affiliations
- Previous classes: Class D
- Previous leagues: Southwest Washington League (1903–06); Washington State League (1910, 1912); Timber League (1924–1931, 1936–37); Harbor State League (1932–35)

Minor league titles
- League titles (1): 1904

Team data
- Previous names: Hoquiam Perfect Gentlemen (1903–04); Hoquiam Cougars (1912)
- Ballpark: Athletic Park

The Hoquiam Loggers was the name of at least three different baseball teams based in Hoquiam, Washington. The first incarnation of the team was formed in 1903 as the Hoquiam Perfect Gentlemen and played in the Southwest Washington League until 1906 (the team's name was changed to the Loggers in 1905). The team was revived briefly in 1910 for the Washington State League before folding that year. In 1912, the Hoquiam Cougars were formed and folded after one season. The final incarnation of the team was formed in 1924 and were charter members of the semi-professional Timber League, which was based in Washington state. That franchise moved to the semi-pro Harbor State League in 1932 but re-joined the Timber League after four seasons. The team folded in 1937 when the Timber League disbanded.

== History ==
The team was formed under the name the Hoquiam Perfect Gentlemen in 1903 as a charter franchise in the Southwest Washington League, a Class D Minor League Baseball circuit in Washington state. The team threatened to disband after league president John P. Fink ruled against their protest of a game against the Olympia Senators in August 1903. Walter Gregg served as the team's business manager during their inaugural season. Hoquiam tied with the Aberdeen Pippins for the league title in 1903 and a playoff series was scheduled to determine the winner. Hoquiam declined the series and Aberdeen was given the league pennant. In 1904, Hoquiam played a series against the Aberdeen Pippins for a $50 purse. Hoquiam won the league pennant in 1904. Ralph Philbrick was the team's manager in 1903 and 1904. In 1905, the team was re-named from the Perfect Gentlemen to the Loggers. The team was forced to fold when the league disbanded in 1906.

In 1910, the Washington State League was formed and a charter franchise was awarded to Hoquiam, Washington. A committee was tasked with forming the team was $600 short of the necessary $1,000 to finance the team two weeks before the start of the season. While the team did end up starting the season, financial problem persisted and the team was disbanded on July 15, 1910 before an upcoming series in Tacoma, Washington. There was an effort to re-create the team for the 1911 season that never materialized, however, in 1912 a team called the Hoquiam Cougars were admitted to the Washington State League. Ed Ford was hired to manage the team in April 1912, but was replaced by player-manager Joseph Wilkins before the end of the season.

The Hoquiam Loggers were revived in 1924 for the fledgling Timber League, a semi-professional baseball league based in Washington state. In 1932, the Loggers joined the Harbor State League where they played until 1936 when they re-joined the Timber League. The team—along with the league—folded in 1937.
